= Pakistan Army =

Land service branch of the Pakistan Armed Forces

- Pak Army پاک فوج
- Emblem of Pakistan Army
- Founded: 14 August 1947 (79 years, 3 months ago)
- Country: Pakistan
- Type: Army
- Role: Land warfare
- Size: 560,000 active-duty personnel 565,000 reserve force 185,000 National Guard
- Part of: Pakistan Armed Forces
- Garrison: General Headquarters (GHQ), Rawalpindi, Punjab
- Mottos: Iman, taqwa, jihad fi sabilillah (Faith, Piety, Struggle in the name of God)
- Colours: Green and white
- Anniversaries: Defence Day: 6 September; Youm-e-Marka-e-Haq : 10 May
- Equipment: List of equipment of the Pakistan Army
- Engagements: See list: India–Pakistan wars and conflicts; Kashmir conflict (1947–present); India–Pakistan war of 1947–1948; India–Pakistan war of 1965; Bangladesh Liberation War; Operation Searchlight; India–Pakistan war of 1971; Siachen conflict (1984–2003); 1999 Kargil War; 2001–02 India–Pakistan standoff; 2008 India–Pakistan standoff; 2011 India–Pakistan border skirmishes; 2013 India–Pakistan border skirmishes; 2014–2015 India–Pakistan border skirmishes; 2016–2018 India–Pakistan border skirmishes; 2016 Indian Line of Control strike; 2019 India–Pakistan border skirmishes; 2020–2021 India–Pakistan border skirmishes; 2025 India–Pakistan conflict Conflicts in the Middle East; Omani Civil War; Black September; 1967 Arab–Israeli War; 1973 Arab–Israeli War; Omani Civil War; 1979 Grand Mosque seizure; Lebanese Civil War; Gulf War; Pakistan Armed Forces deployments in Saudi Arabia Durand Line Conflict; Bajaur Campaign; Battle of Jalalabad; Pakistan–Afghanistan clashes (2024–present); 2025 Afghanistan–Pakistan conflict; 2026 Afghanistan–Pakistan war Afghan conflict; Soviet–Afghan War; Operation Cyclone; Battle for Hill 3234; Operation Magistral; Raids inside Soviet Union during Soviet Afghan War; Badaber uprising; First Afghan Civil War (1989–1992); Second Afghan Civil War (1992–1996); Third Afghan Civil War (1996–2001); 2026 Afghanistan–Pakistan war U.S.-led War on Terror; War in Afghanistan (2001–2021) Pakistan's war on terror; War in North-West Pakistan; Operation al-Mizan; Battle of Wana; Siege of Lal Masjid; Battle of Mir Ali; Operation Rah-e-Haq; Operation Sirat-e-Mustaqeem; Operation Zalzala; Operation Sherdil; Operation Black Thunderstorm; Operation Rah-e-Rast; Operation Rah-e-Nijat; 2009 Khyber Pass offensive; Operation Janbaz; Mohmand offensive; Orakzai and Kurram offensive; Operation Koh-e-Sufaid; Operation Rah-e-Shahadat; Operation Khyber; Operation Zarb-e-Azb; Operation Ghazi; Operation Radd-ul-Fasaad; 2023 Chitral cross-border attacks; 2023 Kurram conflict; 2024 Kurram conflict; Operation Azm-e-Istehkam; Operation Sarbakaf; Pakistan–Afghanistan clashes (2024–present); 2025 Afghanistan–Pakistan conflict; Pakistan–United States skirmishes; 2011 NATO attack in Pakistan United Nations Missions; Unified Task Force; Somali Civil War; Battle of Mogadishu; United Nations Protection Force; Yugoslav Wars; Bosnian War; 1999 East Timorese crisis; UNSM Haiti Sri Lankan Civil War; Military aid to Sri Lankan security forces Miscellaneous Conflicts; Nagorno−Karabakh conflict (alleged) Internal Conflicts; Insurgency in Balochistan (1948–present); First Balochistan conflict; Second Balochistan conflict; Third Balochistan conflict; Fourth Balochistan conflict; Fifth Balochistan conflict; Waziristan rebellion (1948-1954); 1955 Poonch uprising; Operation Search Sudhan; Sectarian conflicts in Pakistan; Malakand insurrection (1994-1995); MQM Militancy; Operation Clean-up; Dir campaign; 1976 Dir rebellion; Operation Zarb-e-Ahan; Karachi Operation Military Coups; 1951 coup d'état attempt; 1958 coup d'état; 1969 coup d'état; 1973 Pakistani coup d'etat attempt; 1977 coup d'état; 1980 Pakistani coup d'etat attempt; 1984 Pakistani coup d'etat attempt; 1995 coup d'état attempt; 1999 coup d'état
- Website: pakistanarmy.gov.pk

Commanders
- Commander-in-Chief: President Asif Ali Zardari
- Chief of Defence Forces: F.M Asim Munir
- Chief of the Army Staff: F.M Asim Munir
- Chief of the General Staff: Lt. Gen. Omer Ahmed Bokhari
- Quartermaster General: Lt. Gen. Muhammad Hassan Khattak
- Adjutant General: Lt. Gen. Azhar Waqas

Insignia
- Flag

Aircraft flown
- Attack: Changhe Z-10, Mil Mi-35M Hind, Bell AH-1F, Eurocopter AS550 C3 Fennec, NESCOM Burraq, CASC Rainbow
- Helicopter: Changhe Z-10, Mil Mi-17, Mil Mi-8, Bell UH-1 Iroquois, Bell 412, Bell 407, Bell 206, Aérospatiale Alouette III, Aérospatiale Lama, Enstrom F-28, Schweizer 300
- Transport: Harbin Y-12, Cessna Citation Bravo, Cessna 206 PAC MFI-17 Mushshak

The Pakistan Army or Pak Army (Urdu: پاک فوج, romanized: Pāk Fauj, pronounced [ˈpaːk fɔːdʒ]) is the land service branch and the largest component of the Pakistan Armed Forces. The president of Pakistan is the supreme commander of the army. As of the 2025 reforms, the Pakistan Army is commanded by the Chief of Defence Forces (CDF), a position held concurrently by the Chief of Army Staff (COAS), who is typically a four-star general. The Army was officially established in August 1947 after the Partition of India. According to statistics provided by the International Institute for Strategic Studies (IISS) in 2025, the Pakistan Army has approximately 560,000 active duty personnel, supported by the National Guard and the Civil Armed Forces. In accordance with the Constitution of Pakistan, Pakistani citizens can voluntarily enlist in military service as early as age 17, but cannot be deployed for combat until age 18.

The primary objective and constitutional mission of the Pakistan Army is to ensure the national security and national unity of Pakistan by defending it against external aggression or the threat of war. It can also be requisitioned by the Pakistani federal government to respond to internal threats within its borders. During national or international calamities or emergencies, it conducts humanitarian rescue operations at home and is an active participant in peacekeeping missions mandated by the United Nations (UN). Notably, it played a major role in rescuing trapped American soldiers who had requested the assistance of a quick reaction force during Operation Gothic Serpent in Somalia. Pakistan Army troops also had a relatively strong presence as part of a UN and NATO coalition during the Bosnian War and the larger Yugoslav Wars.

The Pakistan Army, a major component of the Pakistani military alongside the Pakistan Navy and Pakistan Air Force, is a volunteer force that saw extensive combat during three major wars with India, several border skirmishes with Afghanistan at the Durand Line, and a long-running insurgency in the Balochistan region that it has been combatting alongside Iranian security forces since 1948. Since the 1960s, elements of the army have repeatedly been deployed in an advisory capacity in the Arab states during the Arab–Israeli wars, and to aid the United States-led coalition against Iraq during the First Gulf War. Other notable military operations during the global war on terrorism in the 21st century have included: Zarb-e-Azb, Black Thunderstorm, and Rah-e-Nijat.

In violation of its constitutional mandate, it has repeatedly overthrown elected civilian governments, overreaching its protected constitutional mandate to "act in the aid of civilian federal governments when called upon to do so". The army has been involved in enforcing martial law against the federal government with the claim of restoring law and order in the country by dismissing the legislative branch and parliament on multiple occasions in past decades—while maintaining a wider commercial, foreign and political interest in the country. This has led to allegations that it has acted as a state within a state.

The Pakistan Army is operationally and geographically divided into various corps. The Pakistani constitution mandates the role of the president of Pakistan as the civilian commander-in-chief of the Pakistani military. The Pakistan Army is commanded by the Chief of Army Staff, also known as (Urdu: سپہ سالار; romanized Sipah Salaar) who is by statute (although typically) a four-star general and a senior member of the Joint Chiefs of Staff Committee appointed by the prime minister and subsequently affirmed by the president. The current Chief of the Army Staff is Field Marshal Asim Munir, who was appointed on 29 November 2022 and promoted to field marshal in May 2025.

== Mission ==
Its existence and constitutional role are protected by the Constitution of Pakistan, where its role is to serve as the land-based uniform service branch of the Pakistan Armed Forces. The Constitution of Pakistan establishes the principal land warfare uniform branch in the Pakistan Armed Forces as its states:

The Armed Forces shall, under the directions of the Federal Government, defend Pakistan against external aggression or threat of war, and, subject to law, act in aid of civil power when called upon to do so.

— Constitution of Pakistan

== History ==
=== Division of British Indian Army and the first war with India (1947–1952) ===
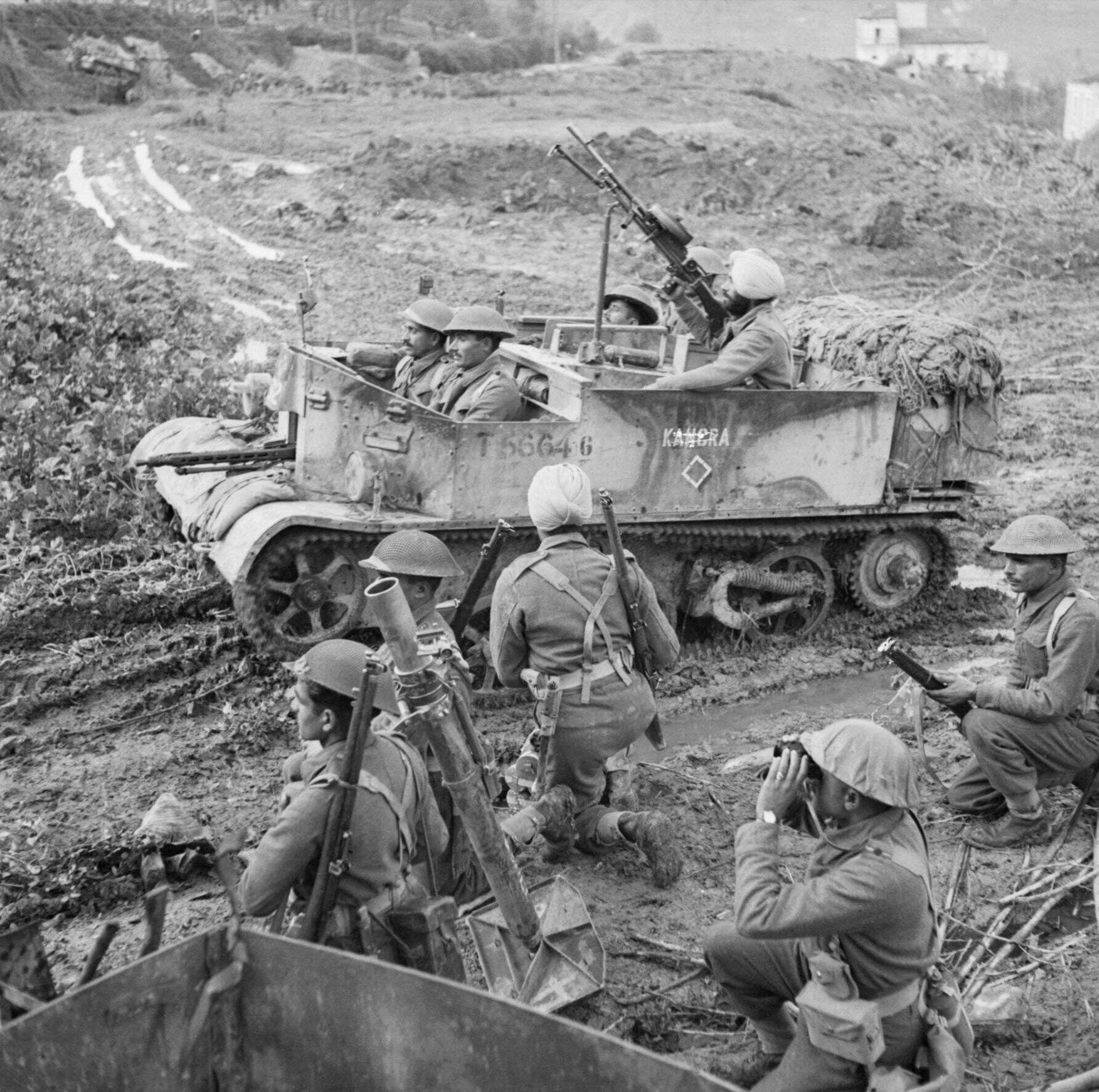
The 6th Frontier Force Regiment of the British Indian Army in the fronts of World War II in Italy in 1943–44

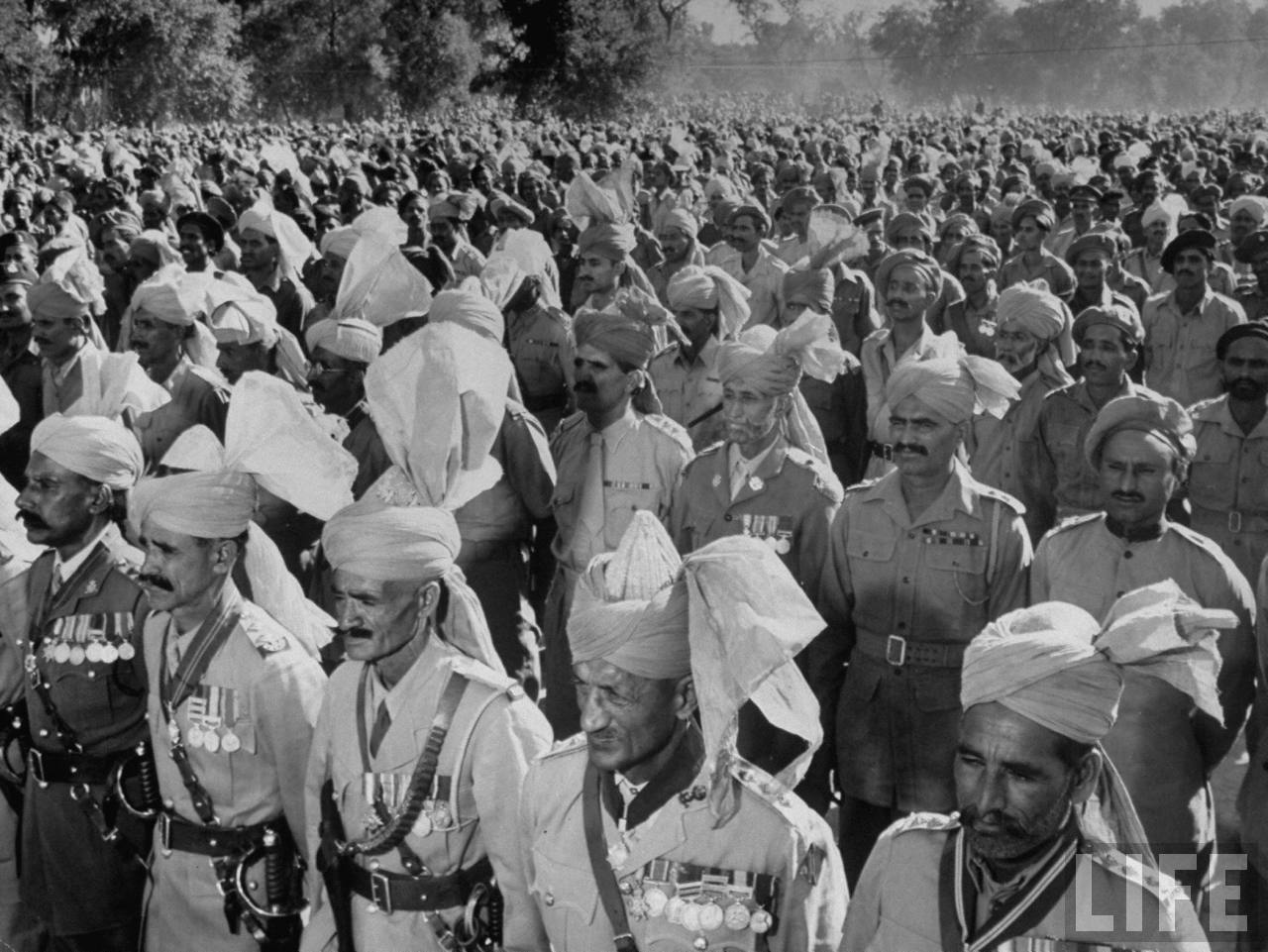
Members of the newly formed Pakistani Security Guard standing at attention during parade review for Pakistan's Leader Jinnah

The Pakistan Army came into its modern birth from the division of the British Indian Army that ceased to exist as a result of the partition of India that resulted in the creation of Pakistan on 14 August 1947. Before even the partition took place, there were plans ahead of dividing the British Indian Army into different parts based on the religious and ethnic influence on the areas of India.

On 30 June 1947, the War Department of the British administration in India began planning the dividing of the ~400,000 men strong British Indian Army, but that only began few weeks before the partition of India that resulted in violent religious violence in India. The Armed Forces Reconstitution Committee (AFRC) under the chairmanship of British Field Marshal Sir Claude Auchinleck had devised the formula to divide the military assets between India and Pakistan with ratio of 2:1, respectively.

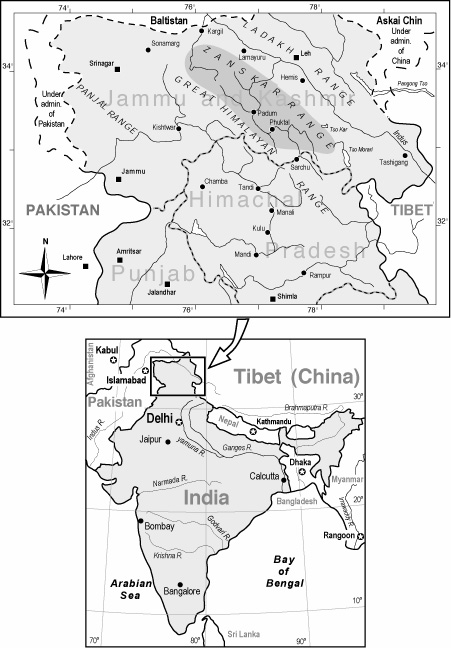
The Map of Kashmir, showing the tri-national control from China, Pakistan, and India, ca. 2005

A major division of the army was overseen by Sir Chandulal Madhavlal Trivedi, an Indian civil servant who was influential in making sure that ~260,000 men would be transferred into forming the Indian Army whilst the remaining balance going to Pakistan after the independence act was enacted by the United Kingdom on the night of 14/15 August 1947.

Command and control at all levels of the new army was extremely difficult, as Pakistan had received six armoured, eight artillery and eight infantry regiments compared to the twelve armoured, forty artillery and twenty-one infantry regiments that went to India. In total, the size of the new army was about ~150,000 men strong. To fill the vacancy in the command positions of the new army, around 13,500 military officers from the British Army had to be employed in the Pakistan Army, which was quite a large number, under the command of Lieutenant-General Frank Messervy, the first commander-in-chief of the Pakistan Army.

Eminent fears of India's seizing the control over the state of Kashmir, the armed tribes and the irregular militia entered in the Muslim-majority valley of Kashmir to oppose the rule of Hari Singh, a Hindu and the ruling Maharaja of Kashmir, in October 1947. Attempting to maintain his control over the princely state, Hari Singh deployed his troops to check on the tribal advances but his troops failed to halt the advancing tribes towards the valley. Eventually, Hari Singh appealed to Louis Mountbatten, the Governor-General of India, requesting for the deployment of the Indian Armed Forces but Indian government maintained that the troops could be committed if Hari Singh acceded to India. Hari Singh eventually agreed to concede to the Indian government terms which eventually led to the deployment of the Indian Army in Kashmir– this agreement, however, was contested by Pakistan since the agreement did not include the consent of the Kashmiri people. Sporadic fighting between militia and Indian Army broke out, and units of the Pakistan Army under Maj-Gen. Akbar Khan, eventually joined the militia in their fight against the Indian Army.

Although, it was Lieutenant-General Sir Frank Messervy who opposed the tribal invasion in a cabinet meeting with Prime Minister Liaquat Ali Khan in 1947, later leaving the command of the army in 1947, in a view of that British officers in the Indian and Pakistan Army would be fighting with each other in the war front. It was Lt-Gen. Douglas Gracey who reportedly disobeyed the direct orders from Muhammad Ali Jinnah, the Governor-General of Pakistan, for the deployment of the army units and ultimately issued standing orders that refrained the units of Pakistan Army to further participate in the conflict.

By 1948, when it became imperative in Pakistan that India was about to mount a large-scale operation against Pakistan, Gen. Gracey did not object to the deployment of the army units in the conflict against the Indian Army.

This earlier insubordination of Gen. Gracey eventually forced India and Pakistan to reach a compromise through the United Nations' intervention, with Pakistan controlling the Western Kashmir and India controlling the Eastern Kashmir.

=== 20th century: Cold war and conflict performances ===
==== Reorganization under the United States Army (1952–1958) ====
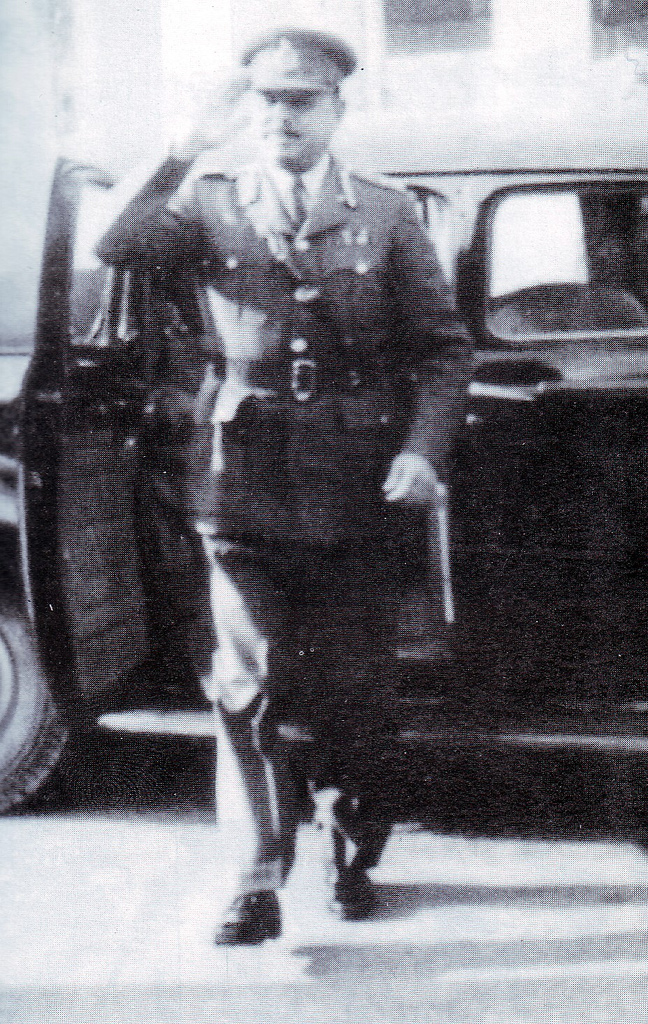
General Ayub Khan arriving to take over command of the Pakistan Army at the Army GHQ in Rawalpindi, Punjab in Pakistan on 17 January 1951

At the time of the partition of British India, British Field Marshal (United Kingdom) Sir Claude Auchinleck favored the transfer of the infantry divisions to the Pakistan Army including the 7th, 8th and 9th. In 1948, the British army officers in the Pakistan Army established and raised the 10th, 12th, and the 14th infantry divisions— with the 14th being established in East Bengal. In 1950, the 15th Infantry Division was raised with the help from the United States Army, followed by the establishment of the 15th Lancers in Sialkot. Dependence on the United States grew furthermore by the Pakistan Army despite it had worrisome concerns to the country's politicians. Between 1950 and 1954, Pakistan Army raised six more armoured regiments under the U.S. Army's guidance: including, 4th Cavalry, 12th Cavalry, 15th Lancers, and 20th Lancers.

After the incident involving Gracey's disobedience, there was a strong belief that a native commander of the Pakistan army should be appointed, which resulted in the Government of Pakistan rejecting the British Army Board's replacement of Gen. Gracey upon his replacement, in 1951. Eventually, Prime Minister Liaquat Ali Khan approved the promotion paper of Maj-Gen. Iftikhar Khan as the first native commander-in-chief, a graduate of the Imperial Defence College in England, but died in an aviation accident en route to Pakistan from the United Kingdom.

After the death of Maj-Gen. Iftikhar, there were four senior major-generals in the army in the race of promotion but the most junior, Maj-Gen. Ayub Khan, whose name was not included in the promotion list was elevated to the promotion that resulted in a lobbying provided by Iskandar Mirza, the Defense Secretary in Ali Khan administration. A tradition of appointment based on favoritism and qualification that is still in practice by the civilian Prime Ministers in Pakistan. Ayub was promoted to the acting rank of full general to command the army as his predecessors Frank Messervy and Douglas Gracey were performing the duty of commander-in-chief of the Pakistan Army in the acting rank of general, the neighboring country India's first commanders-in-chief were same in this context.

The department of the army under General Ayub Khan steered the army's needs towards heavy focus and dependence towards the imported hardware acquired from the United States, in spite of acquiring it from the domestic industry, under the Military Assistance Advisory Group attached to Pakistan in 1954–56. In 1953, the 6th Infantry Division was raised and disbanded the 6th Division in 1956 followed by the disbandment of the 9th Infantry Division as the American assistance was available only for one armored and six infantry divisions. During this time, an army combat brigade team was readily made available by Gen. Ayub Khan to deploy to support the American Army's fighting troops in the Korean war.

Working as cabinet minister in Bogra administration, Gen. Ayub's impartiality was greatly questioned by country's politicians and drove Pakistan's defence policy towards the dependence on the United States when the country becoming the party of the CENTO and the SEATO, the U.S. active measures against the expansion of the global communism.

In 1956, the 1st Armored Division in Multan was established, followed by the Special Forces in Cherat under the supervision of the U.S. Army's Special Forces. Under Gen. Ayub's control, the army had eradicated the British influence but invited the American expansion and had reorganized the East Bengal Regiment in East Bengal, the Frontier Force Regiment in Northern Pakistan, Kashmir Regiment in Kashmir, and Frontier Corps in the Western Pakistan. The order of precedence changed from Navy–Army–Air Force to Army–Navy–Air Force, with army being the most senior service branch in the structure of the Pakistani military.

In 1957, the I Corps was established and headquarter was located in Punjab. Between 1956 and 1958, the schools of infantry and tactics, artillery, ordnance, armoured, medical, engineering, services, aviation, and several other schools and training centers were established with or without U.S. participation.

==== Military takeovers in Pakistan and second war with India (1958–1969) ====
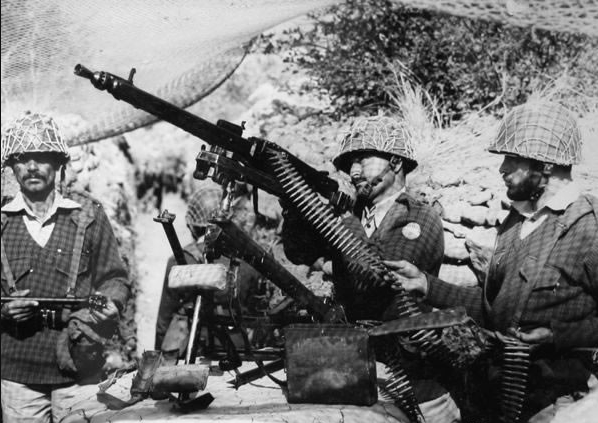
Pakistani Army Position, MG1A3 AA, 1965 War

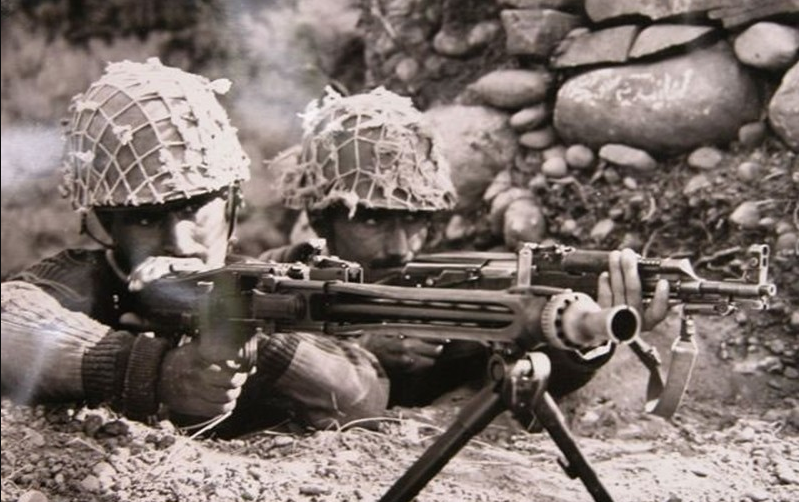
Pakistani Infantry, 1965 War

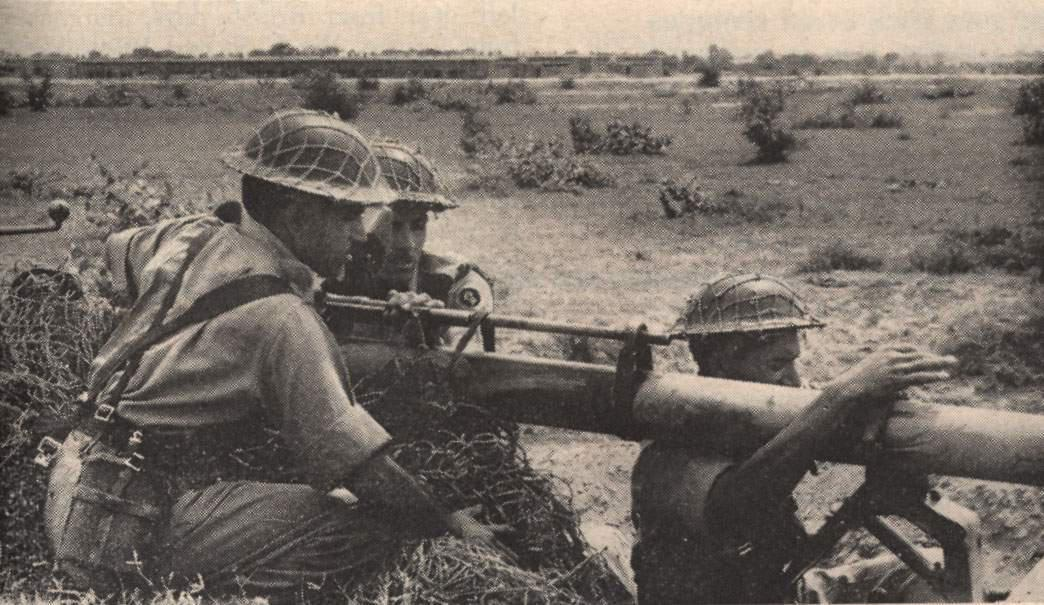
A Pakistan Army 106mm recoilless rifle position - 1965 war.

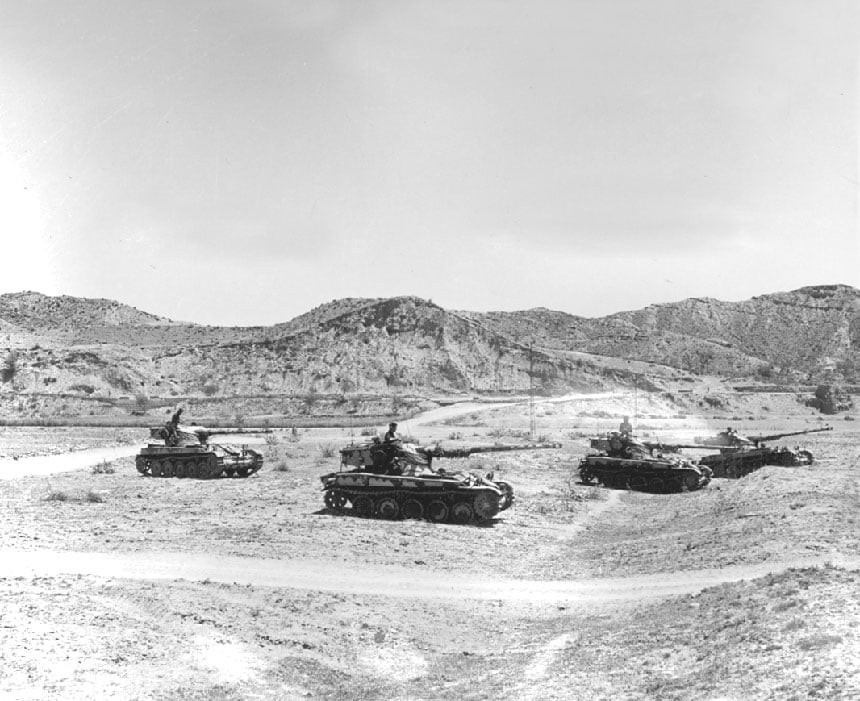
An operational tank squadron of the Pakistan Army equipped with the Indian tanks (French-build AMXs) captured in the Chhamb battle, out on maneuvers.

As early as 1953, the Pakistan Army became involved in national politics in a view of restoring the law and order situation when Governor-General Malik Ghulam, with approval from Prime Minister Khawaja Nazimuddin, dismissed the popularly-mandated state government of Chief Minister Mumtaz Daultana in Punjab in Pakistan, and declared martial law under Lt-Gen. Azam Khan and Col. Rahimuddin Khan who successfully quelled the religious agitation in Lahore. In 1954, the Pakistan Army's Military Intelligence Corps reportedly sent the intelligence report indicating the rise of communism in East Pakistan during the legislative election held in East-Bengal. Within two months of the elections, Prime Minister Mohammad Ali Bogra, with approval from Governor-General Malik Ghulam, dismissed another popularly-mandated state government of Chief Minister Fazlul Huq in East Bengal in Pakistan, and declared governor's rule under Iskandar Mirza who relied in the Pakistan Army to manage the control and security of the East Bengal at all levels of command. With General Ayub Khan becoming the Defense Minister under Ministry of Talents led by Prime Minister Bogra, the involvement of the army in the national politics grew further with the implementation of the controversial One Unit program, abolishing the status of Four Provinces, despite the strong protests by the public and the West Pakistan's politicians. Major defense funding and spending was solely focused towards Ayub's army department and the air force department led by Air Marshal Asghar Khan, giving less priority to the national needs for the Navy.

From 1954 to 1958, Ayub Khan was made subjected with receiving multiple service extensions by the civilian Prime Ministers first receiving in 1954 that extended his service to last till 1958.

The Pakistan Army under Ayub Khan had been less supportive towards the implementation of the first set of Constitution of Pakistan that had established the civilian control of the military, and the army went on to completely endorse and support the first martial law in the country imposed by President Iskander Mirza– the army later took control of the power from President Mirza in mere two weeks and installed Ayub Khan as the second President. The subsequent change of command resulted in Gen. Musa Khan becoming the army commander with Ayub Khan promoting himself as controversial rank of field marshal. In 1969, the Supreme Court reversed its decision and overturned its convictions that called for validation of martial law in 1958.

The army held the referendum and tightly control the political situation through the intelligence agencies, and banned the political activities in the country.

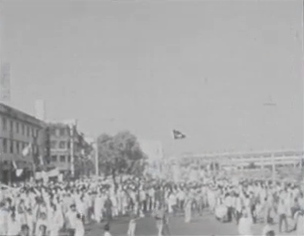
The public society in Pakistan rallying in support of the Pakistan Army in 1965

From 1961 to 1962, military aid continued to Pakistan from the United States and they established the 25th Cavalry, followed by the 24th Cavalry, 22nd, and 23rd Cavalry. In 1960–61, the Army Special Forces was reportedly involved in taking over the control of the administration of Dir from the Nawab of Dir in Chitral in North-West Frontier Province over the concerns of Afghan meddling in the region. In 1964–65, the border fighting and tensions flared with the Indian Army with a serious incident taking place near the Rann of Kutch in which Pakistan lunched its first ever tank assault and defeated the Indian in series of battles under Operation Desert Hawk, followed by the failed covert action to take control of the Indian-side of Kashmir resulted in a massive retaliation by the Indian Army on 5 August 1965. On 1 September Pakistan army launched Operation Grand Slam and captured 340 square miles inside India the attack halted at the outskirts of Indian city Ankhnoor. On the night of 6 September 1965, India opened the front against Pakistan when the Indian Army's mechanized corps charged forwards taking over the control of the Pakistan-side of Punjab, almost reaching Lahore. At the time of the conflict in 1965, Pakistan's armory and mechanized units' hardware was imported from the United States including the M4 Sherman, M24 Chaffee, M36 Jackson, and the M47 and M48 Patton tanks, equipped with 90 mm guns. In contrast, the Indian Army's armor had outdated in technology with Korean war-usage American M4 Sherman and World War II manufactured British Centurion Tank, fitted with the French-made CN-75 guns. Although Pakistani army had only 233,000 troops against 900,000 Indian troops.

Pakistan technology advantage in tanks and artillery cancelled out by Indian numeric superiority the Indian Army penetrated the defences of Pakistan's borderline and successfully captured around 360 to 500 square kilometres (140 to 190 square miles) of Pakistani Punjab territory on the outskirts of Lahore. A major tank battle took place in Chawinda, at which the newly established 1st Armoured Division was able to halt the Indian invasion. Eventually, the Indian invasion of Pakistan came to halt when the Indian Army concluded the battle near Burki. With diplomatic efforts and involvement by the Soviet Union to bring two nations to end the war, the Ayub administration reached a compromise with Shastri ministry in India when both governments signed and ratified the Tashkent Declaration. According to the Library of Congress Country Studies conducted by the Federal Research Division of the United States:

The war was militarily inconclusive; each side held prisoners and some territory belonging to the other. Losses were relatively heavy—on the Pakistani side, twenty aircraft, 200 tanks, and 3,800 troops. Pakistan's army had been able to withstand Indian pressure, but a continuation of the fighting would only have led to further losses and ultimate defeat for Pakistan. Most Pakistanis, schooled in the belief of their own martial prowess, refused to accept the possibility of their country's military defeat by "Hindu India" and were, instead, quick to blame their failure to attain their military aims on what they considered to be the ineptitude of Ayub Khan and his government.

According to neural claims Pakistan suffered from 1,500 Soldiers killed and 4,300 wounded and India suffered from 3,712 Soldiers killed and 7,638 wounded. Pakistan lost 200-250 tanks, and India lost 200-300 tanks.

However, most neutral assessments agree that India had the upper hand over Pakistan when ceasefire was declared, but the propaganda in Pakistan about the war continued in favor of Pakistan Army. The war was not rationally analysed in Pakistan with most of the blame being heaped on the leadership and little importance given to intelligence failures that persisted until the debacle of the third war with India in 1971. The Indian Army's action was restricted to Punjab region of both sides with Indian Army mainly in fertile Sialkot, Lahore and Kashmir sectors, while Pakistani land gains were primarily in southern deserts opposite Sindh and in the Chumb sector near Kashmir in the north.

With the United States' arms embargo on Pakistan over the issue of the war, the army instead turned to the Soviet Union and China for hardware acquisition, and correctly assessed that a lack of infantry played a major role in the failure of Pakistani armour to translate its convincing material and technical superiority into a major operational or strategic success against the Indian Army. Ultimately, the army's high command established the 9th, 16th, and 17th infantry divisions in 1966–68. In 1966, the IV Corps was formed and its headquarter was established, and permanently stationed in Lahore, Punjab in Pakistan.

The army remained involved in the nation's civic affairs, and ultimately imposed the second martial law in 1969 when the writ of the constitution was abrogated by then-army commander, Gen. Yahya Khan, who took control of the nation's civic affairs after the resignation of President Ayub Khan, resulted in a massive labor strikes instigated by the Pakistan Peoples Party in West and Awami League in East Pakistan.

In a lawsuit settled by the Supreme Court of Pakistan, the legality of the martial law was deemed questionable as the Supreme Court settled the suit by retroactively invalidated the martial law that suspended the Constitution and notably ruled that Yahya Khan's assumption of power was "illegal usurpation". In light of the Supreme Court's judgement, the army held the publicly televised conference when President Yahya Khan announced to hold the nationwide general elections in 1969–70.

==== Suppression, civil conflict in East Pakistan and Indian invasion (1969–1971) ====
In 1969, President Yahya Khan decided to make administrative changes in the army by appointing the Gen. Abdul Hamid Khan as the Army Chief of Staff (ACOS) of the Pakistan Army, who centralized the chain of command in Rawalpindi in a headquarters known as "High Command". From 1967 to 1969, a series of major military exercises was conducted by infantry units on East Pakistan's border with India. In 1970, the Pakistan army's military mission in Jordan was reportedly involved in tackling and curbing down the Palestinian infiltration in Jordan. In June 1971, the enlistment in the army had allowed the Army GHQ in Rawalpindi to raise and established the 18th infantry division, stationed in Hyderabad, Sindh, for the defence of 900 kilometres (560 mi) from Rahimyar Khan to Rann of Kutch, and restationed the 23rd infantry division for defending the Chhamb-Dewa Sector.

In 1971, the II Corps was established and headquartered in Multan, driven towards defending the mass incursion from the Indian Army. In December 1971, the 33rd infantry division was established from the army reserves of the II Corps, followed by raising the 37th Infantry Division. Pakistan Army reportedly helped the Pakistan Navy towards establishing its amphibious branch, the Pakistan Marines, whose battalions was airlifted to East Pakistan along with the 9th Infantry Division.

The intervention in East Pakistan further grew when the Operation Searchlight resulted in the overtaking of the government buildings, communication centers, and restricting the politicians opposed to military rule. Within a month, Pakistani national security strategists realized their failure of implementing the plan which had not anticipated civil resistance in East, and the real nature of Indian strategy behind their support of the resistance.

The Yahya administration is widely accused of permitting the army to commit the war crimes against the civilians in East and curbing civil liberties and human rights in Pakistan. The Eastern Command under Lt-Gen. A. A. K. Niazi, who had area responsibility of the defending the Eastern Front and had the responsibility to protect, was leveled with accusations of escalating the political violence in the East by the serving military officers, politicians, and journalists in Pakistan. Since the general elections in 1970, the army had detained several key politicians, journalists, peace activists, student unionists, and other members of civil society while curbing the freedoms of movement and speech in Pakistan. In East Pakistan, the unified Eastern Military Command under Lt-Gen. A.A.K. Niazi, began its engagement with the armed militia that had support from India in April 1971, and eventually fought against the Indian Army in December 1971. The army, together with marines, launched ground offensives on both fronts but the Indian Army successfully held its ground and initiated well-coordinated ground operations on both fronts, initially capturing 15,010 square kilometres (5,795 sq mi) of Pakistan's territory; this land gained by India in Azad Kashmir, Punjab and Sindh sectors.

Responding to the ultimatum issued on 16 December 1971 by the Indian Army in East, Lt-Gen. Niazi agreed to concede defeat and move towards signing the documented surrender with the Indian Army which effectively and unilaterally ended the armed resistance and led the creation of Bangladesh, only after India's official engagement that lasted 13 days. It was reported that the Eastern Command had surrendered ~93,000–97,000 uniform personnel to Indian Army– the largest surrender in a war by any country after the World War II. Casualties inflicted to army's I Corps, II Corps, and Marines did not sit well with President Yahya Khan who turned over control of the civic government to Zulfikar Ali Bhutto through an executive decree.

Commenting on the defeat, the military observer in the Pakistan Army, Major A.H. Amin, reported that the war strategists in the army had not seriously considered a full-fledged invasion from India until December 1971, because it was presumed that the Indian military would not risk intervention by China or the United States, and the high command failed to realize that the Chinese would be unable to intervene during the winter months of November to December, due to snowbound Himalayan passes, and the Americans had not made any real effort to persuade India against attacking East Pakistan.

==== Restructuring of armed forces, stability and restoration (1971–1977) ====
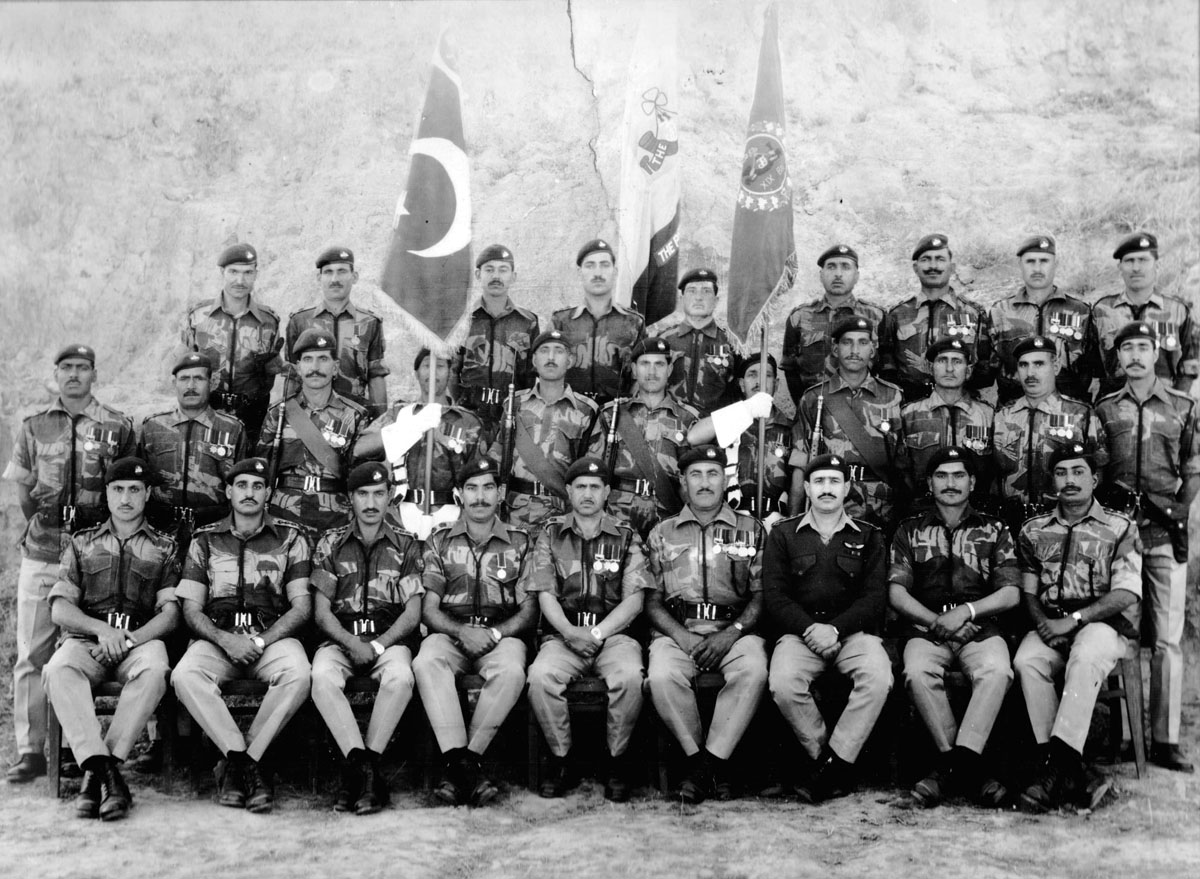
The officers of the 9th Battalion of the Frontier Force Regiment on 23 March 1974

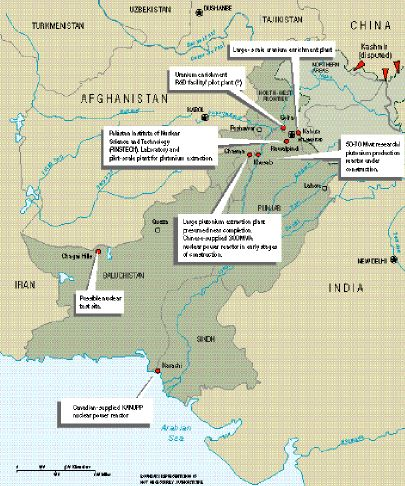
In the 1970s, the Corps of Engineers built many secretive weapon-testing laboratories and sites in the graphite mountain ranges of Pakistan. The footage is provided as an example by the CEIP.

In January 1972, the Bhutto administration formed the POW Commission to investigate the numbers of war prisoners held by the Indian Army while requesting the Supreme Court of Pakistan to investigate the causes of the war failure with India in 1971. The Supreme Court formed the famed War Enquiry Commission (WEC) that identified many failures, fractures, and faults within the institution of the department of the army and submitted recommendations to strengthen the armed forces overall. Under the Yahya administration, the army was highly demoralized and there were unconfirmed reports of mutiny by soldiers against the senior army generals at the Corps garrisons and the Army GHQ in Rawalpindi.

Upon returning from the quick visit in the United States in 1971, President Bhutto forcefully dishonourably discharge seven senior army generals, which he called the "army waderas" (lit. 'Warlords'). In 1972, the army leadership under Lt-Gen. Gul Hassan refrained from acting under Bhutto administration's order to tackle the labor strikes in Karachi and to detained the labor union leaders in Karachi, instead advising the federal government to use the Police Department to take the actions.

On 2 March 1972, President Bhutto dismissed Lt-Gen. Gul Hassan as the army commander, replacing with Lt-Gen. Tikka Khan who was later promoted to four-star rank and appointed as the first Chief of Army Staff (COAS). The army under Bhutto administration was reconstructed in its structure, improving its fighting ability, and reorganized with the establishment of the X Corps in Punjab in 1974, followed by the V Corps in Sindh and XI Corps in the Khyber-Pakhtunkhwa in Pakistan in 1975. The trilateral agreement in India, the Bhutto administration transferred all the war prisoners back to the country but the military struggle to fill in the vacancies and employments due to some suffering from the PTSD and other mental health complications, while others simply did not wanted to serve in the military any longer. During Bhutto's administration, Pakistan's military pursued a policy of greater self-reliance in arms production. This involved efforts to develop domestic capabilities for manufacturing weapons and military equipment. To address material shortages, Pakistan also turned to China for cooperation in establishing essential metal and material industries.

In 1973, the Bhutto administration dismissed the state government in Balochistan that resulting in another separatist movement, culminating the series of army actions in largest province of the country that ended in 1977. With the military aid receiving from Iran including the transfer of the Bell AH-1 Cobra to Aviation Corps, the conflict came to end with the Pakistani government offering the general amnesties to separatists in the 1980s. Over the issue of Baloch conflict, the Pakistani military remained engage in Omani civil war in favor of Omani government until the rebels were defeated in 1979. The War Enquiry Commission noted the lack of joint grand strategy between the four-branches of the military during the first, the second, and the third wars with India, recommending the establishment of the Joint Chiefs of Staff Committee to maintain strategic military communication between the inter-services and the federal government, that is to be chaired by the appointed Chairman joint chiefs as the government's principal military adviser. In 1976, the first Chairman joint chiefs was appointed from the army with Gen. Muhammad Shariff taking over the chairmanship, but resigned a year later. In 1975, Prime Minister Zulfikar Ali Bhutto controversially superseded at least seven senior army generals to promote Lt-Gen. Zia-ul-Haq to the four-star rank, appointing him the Chief of Army Staff (COAS) in spite of army recommendations forwarded to the federal government.

In the 1970s, the army's engineering formations, notable the Corps of Engineers, played a crucial role in supporting the clandestine atomic bomb program to reach its parity and feasibility, including the constructions of iron-steel tunnels in the secretive nuclear weapons-testing sites in 1977–78.

PAF and Navy fighter pilots voluntarily served in Arab nations' militaries against Israel in the Yom Kippur War (1973). According to modern Pakistani sources, in 1974 one of the PAF pilots, Flt. Lt. Sattar Alvi flying a MiG-21 shot down an Israeli Air Force Mirage flown by Captain M. Lutz, and was honoured by the Syrian government. The Israeli pilot later succumbed to wounds he sustained during ejection. However, no major sources from the time reported on such an incident, and there is no mention of "Captain Lutz" in Israel's Ministry of Defense's record of Israel's casualties of war.

==== Middle East operations, peacekeeping missions, and covert actions (1977–1999) ====
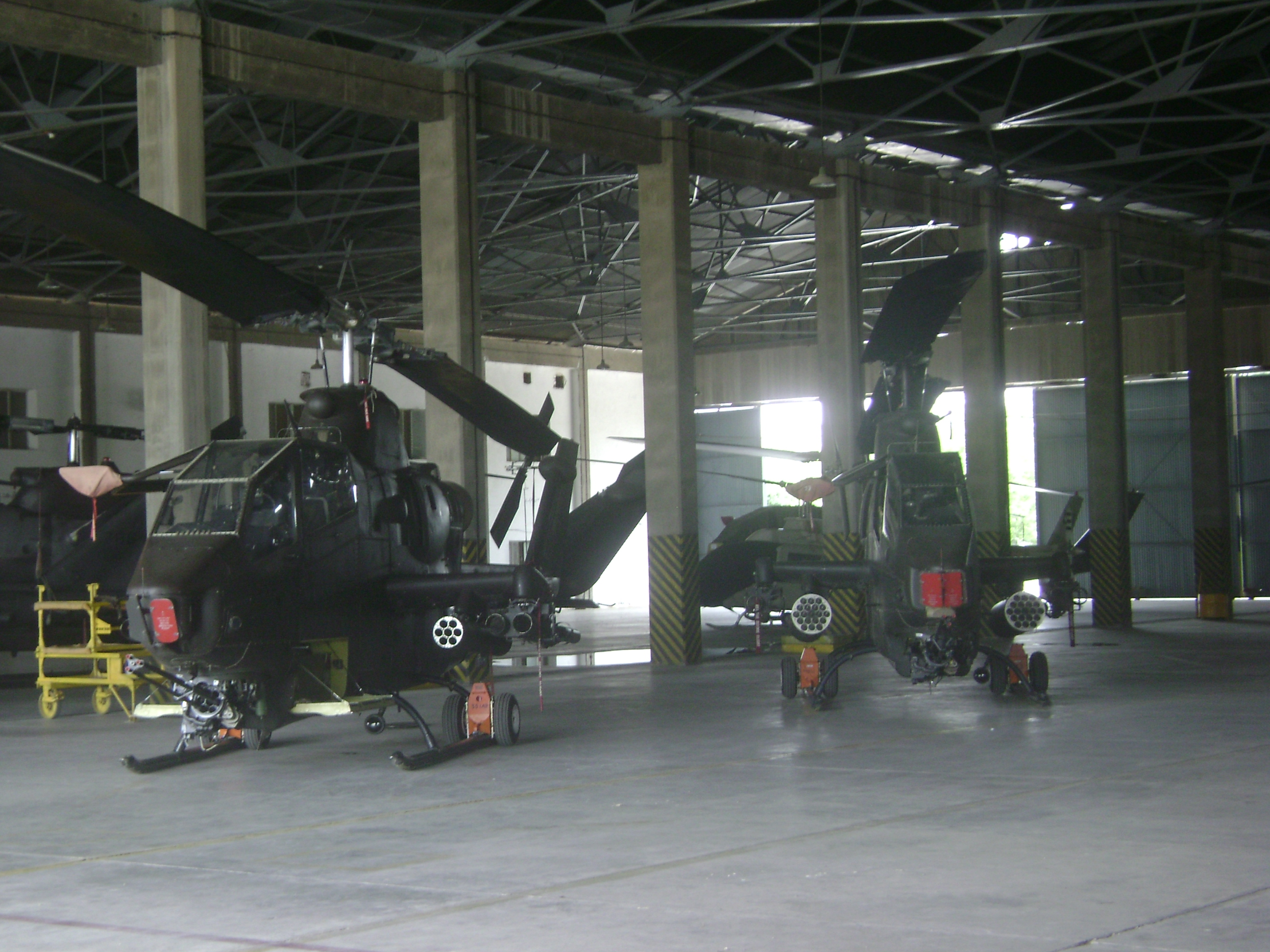
Transferred from Iranian Ground Force in 1973–75, the Pakistan Army acquired additional the AH-1S Cobra attack helicopters from the United States under the Foreign Military Sales to improve the Pakistan's defences in the 1980s.

The political instability increased in the country when the conservative alliance refused to accept the voting turnout in favor of Pakistan Peoples Party (PPP) after the general elections held in 1977. The army, under Gen. Zia-ul-Haq–the army chief, began planning the military takeover of the federal government under Prime Minister Zulfikar Bhutto, eventually leading the coup d'état that suspended the writ of the Constitution amid responding to the call from one of the opposition leader of threatening to call for another civil war. The military interference in civic matters grew further when the martial law was extended for an infinite period despite maintaining that the elections to be held in 90-days prior. At the request from the Saudi monarchy, the Zia administration deployed the company of the special forces to end seizure of the Grand Mosque in Mecca from Islamists.

The army under President Zia weakened due to the army officers were needed in running the affairs of civic government and the controversial military courts that held trials of the communists, dissidents, and the oppositions of Zia's administration. In 1984–85, Pakistan lost the control of her northern glaciers due to the successful expedition and penetration by the Indian Army, and army had to engage in years long difficult battles with Indian Army to regain their areas from the Indian Army. Concerns over the military officers and army personnel needed to counter the further advances by the Indian Army in Northern fronts in 1984, the martial law was lifted following the referendum that approved Zia's presidency and provided a way of holding the general elections in 1985. The military control the under army administration had successfully stabilized the law and order in Balochistan despite the massive illegal immigration from Afghanistan, and issued the general amnesties to separatists and rebels. To address the Afghan containment and security, the army established the XII Corps in 1985 that is permanently headquartered in Quetta, that is designed to provide defence against the infiltration by the Afghan National Army from Afghanistan.

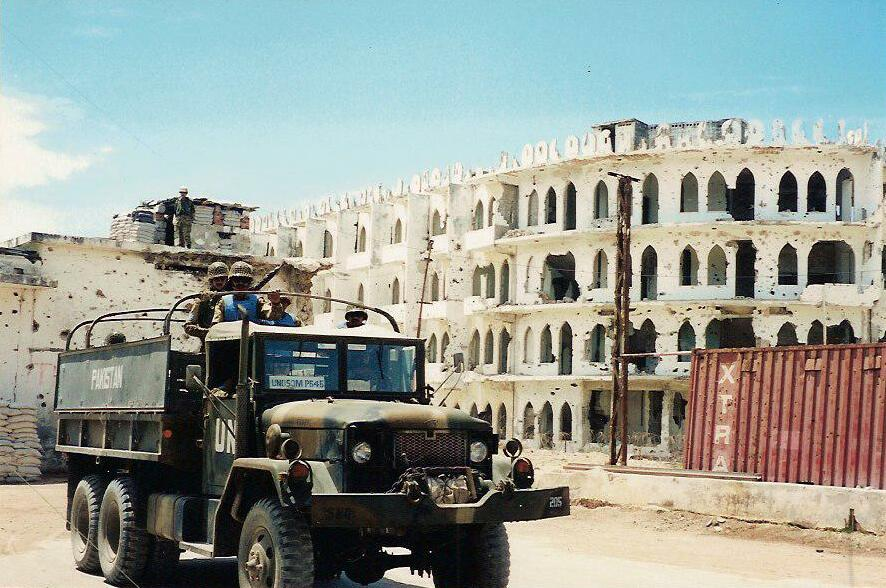
The Pakistan Army's troops, as part of their deployment in Somalia, patrolling off their mission in the Mogadishu in Somalia in 1993

In 1985, the United States approved the military aid package, worth $4.02 billion, to Pakistan when the mujaheddin fighting with the Soviet Union in Afghanistan increased and intensified, with Soviet Army began violating and attacking the insurgents in the tribal areas in Pakistan. In 1986, the tensions with India increased when the Indian Army's standing troops mobilized in combat position in Pakistan's southern frontier with India failing to give notification of exercise to Pakistan prior. In 1987–88, the XXX Corps, headquartered in North of Punjab, and the XXXI Corps, headquartered in South of Punjab, was raised and established to provide defence against the Indian army's mass infiltration.

After the aviation accident that resulted in passing of President Zia in 1988, the army organized the massive military exercise with the Pakistan Air Force to evaluate the technological assessment of the weapon systems and operational readiness. In the 1980s, Pakistan Army remained engage in the affairs of Middle East, first being deployed in Saudi Arabia during the Iran–Iraq War in 1980–1988, and later overseeing operational support measures and combat actions during the Gulf War in 1990–91.

The period from 1991 to 1998 saw the army engaged in professionalism and proved its fighting skills in the Somalian theater (1991–94), Bosnian-Serb War (on Bosnian side from 1994 to 1998), and the other theaters of the Yugoslav Wars, as part of the United Nations' deployment. In 1998, the army's Corps of Engineers played a crucial role in providing the military administration of preparing the atomic weapon-testing in Balochistan when the air force's bombers flew and airlifted the atomic devices. The controversial relief of Gen. Jehangir Karamat by the Sharif administration reportedly disturbed the balance of the civil-military relations with the junior most Lt-Gen. Pervez Musharraf replacing it as chairman joint chiefs and the army chief in 1999.

In May 1999, the Northern Light Infantry, a paramilitary unit based in Gilgit, slipped into Kargil that resulted in heavy border fighting with the Indian Army, inflicted with heavy casualties on both sides. The ill-devised plan without meaningful consideration of the outcomes of the border war with India, the army under Chairman joint chiefs Gen. Pervez Musharraf (also army chief at that time) failed to its combat performance and suffered with similar outcomes as the previous plan in 1965, with the American military observers in the Pakistan military famously commenting to news channels in Pakistan: Kargil was yet another example of Pakistan's (lack of) grand strategy, repeating the follies of the previous wars with India."

=== 21st century: War performances ===
==== Religious insurgency and War on Terror (2001–present) ====
Responding to the terror attacks in New York in the United States, the army joined the combat actions in Afghanistan with the United States and simultaneously engage in military standoff with Indian Army in 2001–2002. In 2004–2006, the military observers from the army were deployed to guide the Sri Lankan army to end the civil war with the Tamil fighters.

To overcome the governance crises in 2004–2007, the Musharraf administration appointed several army officers in the civilian institutions with some receiving extensions while others were deployed from their combat service– thus affecting the fighting capabilities and weakening the army. Under Gen. Musharraf's leadership, the army's capabilities fighting the fanatic Talibans and Afghan Arab fighters in Pakistan further weakened and suffered serious setbacks in gaining control of the tribal belt that fell under the control of the Afghan Arabs and Uzbek fighters. From 2006 to 2009, the army fought the series of bloody battles with the fanatic Afghan Arabs and other foreign fighters most notably the army action against a Islamist private militia at the Red Mosque in Islamabad. and with the controversial assassination of Baloch politician in 2006, the army had to engage in battles with the Baloch separatists fighting for the Balochistan's autonomy.

In April 2007, the major reorganization of the commands of the army was taken place under Gen. Ahsan Saleem Hayat, the vice army chief under Gen. Musharraf, established the Southern, Central, and the Northern Commands. With Gen. Musharraf's resignation and Gen. Ashfaq Parvez Kayani becoming the army chief, the army realigned itself to review its combat policies and withdrew officers in civilian institutions to focus on its primary constitutional mission to protect and responsible in 2009–14. In 2012, there was a serious accident involving the entire battalion from the Northern Light Infantry when the avalanche struck the battalion base in Siachen, entrapping 135 soldiers and including several army officers.

In 2013–2016, the homegrown far-right guerrilla war with the Taliban, Afghan Arabs, and the Central Asian fighters took the decisive turn in favor of the army under Sharif administration, eventually gaining the control of the entire country and established the writ of the constitution in the affected lawless regions. As of its current deployment as of 2019, the army remained engage in border fighting with the Indian Army while deploying its combat strike brigade teams in Saudi Arabia in a response of Saudi intervention in Yemen.

==== 2019 Indo–Pak border clashes ====
In 2019, serious skirmishes erupted between Pakistan and India after Pulwama attack, both sides engaged in heavy border clashes with small arms and artillery all along LOC and also conducted airstrikes on each other. The clashes also witnessed a dogfight in which Pakistan shot down an Indian aircraft and captured the pilot.

== Organization ==
=== Command and control structure ===
Leadership in the army is provided by the Minister of Defense, usually leading and controlling the direction of the department of the army from the Army Secretariat-I at the Ministry of Defense, with the Defense Secretary who is responsible for the bureaucratic affairs of the army's department. The Constitution empowers the President of Pakistan, an elected civilian official, to act as the Commander-in-Chief while the Prime Minister, an elected civilian, to act as the Chief Executive. The Chief of Army Staff, an appointed four-star rank army general, is the highest general officer, under Chairman Joint Chiefs of Staff Committee and Secretary Defense, who acts as the principal military adviser on the expeditionary and land/ground warfare affairs, and a senior member of the Joint Chiefs of Staff Committee– a military body that advises and briefs the elected Prime Minister and its executive cabinet on national security affairs and operational military matters under the Chairman of the Joint Chiefs of Staff Committee.

The single combat headquarter, the Army GHQ, is located in Rawalpindi Cantonment in Punjab in Pakistan, in the vicinity of the Joint Staff Headquarters. The Chief of Army Staff controls and commands the army at all levels of operational command, and is assisted the number of Principal Staff Officers (PSOs) who are three-star rank generals. The military administration under the army chief operating at the Army GHQ including the appointed Principal Staff Officers:

- Chief of General Staff, under whom the Military Operations and Intelligence Directorates function.
- Chief of Logistics Staff.
- Quartermaster General (QMG).
- Master General of Ordnance (MGO).
- Engineer-in-Chief, the chief army engineer and topographer.
- Judge Advocate General.
- Military Secretary.
- Comptroller of Civilian Personnel.

In 2008, a major introduction was made in the military bureaucracy at the Army GHQ under Gen. Ashfaq Parvez Kayani, when two new PSO positions were introduced: the Inspector-General of Arms and the Inspector-General Communications and IT.

The Army's corps are divided into three regional-level commands which are assigned for defending the territories of Pakistan.

== Personnel ==
=== Commissioned officers ===
The commissioned army ranks and insignia authorized in the Pakistan Army are modified and patterned on the British Army's officer ranks and insignia system. There are several paths of becoming the commissioned officer in the army including the admission and required graduation from the Pakistan Military Academy in Kakul. To become an officer in the army, the academic four-year college degree is required for the candidates to become officers in the army, and therefore they are designated by insignia unique to their staff community.

Selection to the officer candidates is highly competitive with ~320–700 individuals are allowed to enter in the Pakistan Military Academy annually, with a small number of already graduated physicians, specialists, veterinaries and the engineers from the civilian universities are directly recruited in the administrative staff corps such as Medical Corps, Veterinary Corps, Engineering Corps, Dental Corps and these graduated individuals are the heart of the administrative corps. The product of a highly competitive selection process, members of the staff corps have completed twelve years of education in their respected fields (such as attending the schools and universities), and has to spend two years at the Pakistan Military Academy, with their time divided about equally between military training and academic work to bring them up to a baccalaureate education level, which includes English-language skills. The Department of Army also offers employment to civilians in financial management, accountancy, engineering, construction, and administration, and has currently employed 6,500 civilians.

The military officers in the Pakistani military seek retirement between the ages of forty-two and sixty, depending on their ranks, and often seeks employment in the federal government or the private sector where the pay scales are higher as well as the opportunity for gain considerably greater.

Rank	O-10	O-9	O-8	O-7	O-6	O-5	O-4	O-3	O-2	O-1	O-1
Insignia											
Title	Field Marshal	General	Lieutenant-General	Major-General	Brigadier	Colonel	Lieutenant-Colonel	Major	Captain	Lieutenant	Second Lieutenant
Abbreviation	FM	Gen.	Lt-Gen.	Maj-Gen.	Brig.	Col.	Lt-Col.	Maj.	Capt.	Lt.	2nd-Lt.
NATO Code	OF-10	OF-9	OF-8	OF-7	OF-6	OF-5	OF-4	OF-3	OF-2	OF-1	OF-1
Rank Hierarchy	Five-star	Four-star	Three-star	Two-star	One-star						

=== Warrant officers ===
The Pakistan Army uniquely uses the junior commissioned officer (JCO) ranks, equivalent of the Warrant officers or the Limited duty officers in the United States military, inherited from the former British Indian Army introduced by the British Army in India between the enlisted and officer ranks. The JCOs are single-track specialists with their subject of expertise in their particular part of the job and initially appointed (NS1) after risen from their enlisted ranks, receiving the promotion (SM3) from the commanding officer.

The usage of the junior commissioned officer is the continuation of the former Viceroy's commissioned officer rank, and the JCO ranking system benefited the army since there was a large gap existed between the officers and the enlisted personnel at the time of the establishment of the new army in 1947. Over the several years, the JCOs rank system has outlived its usefulness because the educational level of the enlisted personnel has risen and the army has more comfortably adopted the U.S. Army's ranking platform than the British. Promotion to the JCO ranks remains a powerful and influential incentive for that enlisted personnel desire not to attend the accredited four-year college.

Junior Commissioned Officer/Warrant Officer ranks
Insignia			
Infantry/other title	Subedar-Major	Subedar	Naib Subedar
Cavalry/armor title	Risaldar Major	Risaldar	Naib Risaldar

=== Enlisted personnel ===
The recruiting and enlistment in the army is nationwide but the army's recruiting command maintains an ethnic balance, with those who turned away are encourage to join the either the Marines or the Air Force. Most enlisted personnel had come from the poor and rural families with many had only rudimentary literacy skills in the past, but with the increase in the affordable education have risen to the matriculation level (12th Grade). In the past, the army recruits had to re-educate the illiterate personnel while processing them gradually through a paternalistically run regimental training center, teaching the official language, Urdu, if necessary, and given a period of elementary education before their military training actually starts.

In the thirty-six-week training period, they develop an attachment to the regiment they will remain with through much of their careers and begin to develop a sense of being a Pakistani rather than primarily a member of a tribe or a village. Enlisted personnel usually serve for eighteen to twenty years, before retiring or gaining a commission, during which they participate in regular military training cycles and have the opportunity to take academic courses to help them advance.

The noncommissioned officers (or enlists) wear respective regimental color chevrons on the right sleeve. Center point of the uppermost chevron must remain 10 cm from the point of the shoulder. The Company/battalion appointments wear the appointments badges on the right wrist. Pay scales and incentives are greater and attractive upon enlistment including the allocation of land, free housing, and financial aid to attend the colleges and universities. Retirement age for the enlisted personnel varies and depends on the enlisted ranks that they have attained during their services.

Structure of enlisted ranks of the Pakistan Army
Pay grade	E-9	E-8	E-7	E-6	E-5	E-4	E-3	E-2	E-1
Insignia								No insignia	No insignia
Title	Battalion Havildar Major/Regimental Daffadar Major	Battalion Quartermaster Havildar/Regimental Quartermaster Daffadar	Company Havildar Major/Squadron Daffadar Major	Company Quartermaster Havildar/Squadron Quartermaster Daffadar	Havildar/Daffadar	Naik/Lance Daffadar	Lance Naik/Acting Lance Daffadar	Sepoy/Sowar	No Equivalent
Abbreviation	BHM/RDM	BQMH/RQD	CHM/SDM	CQMH/SQD	Hav/Dfdr	Nk/L Dfdr	L/Nk/Actg L/Dfdr	Sep/Swr	NE
NATO Code	OR-9	OR-8	OR-7	OR-6	OR-5	OR-4	OR-3	OR-2	OR-1
U.S. Code	SGM	MSG	SFC	SSG	SGT	CPL	PFC	PVT	–

=== Recruitment and training ===
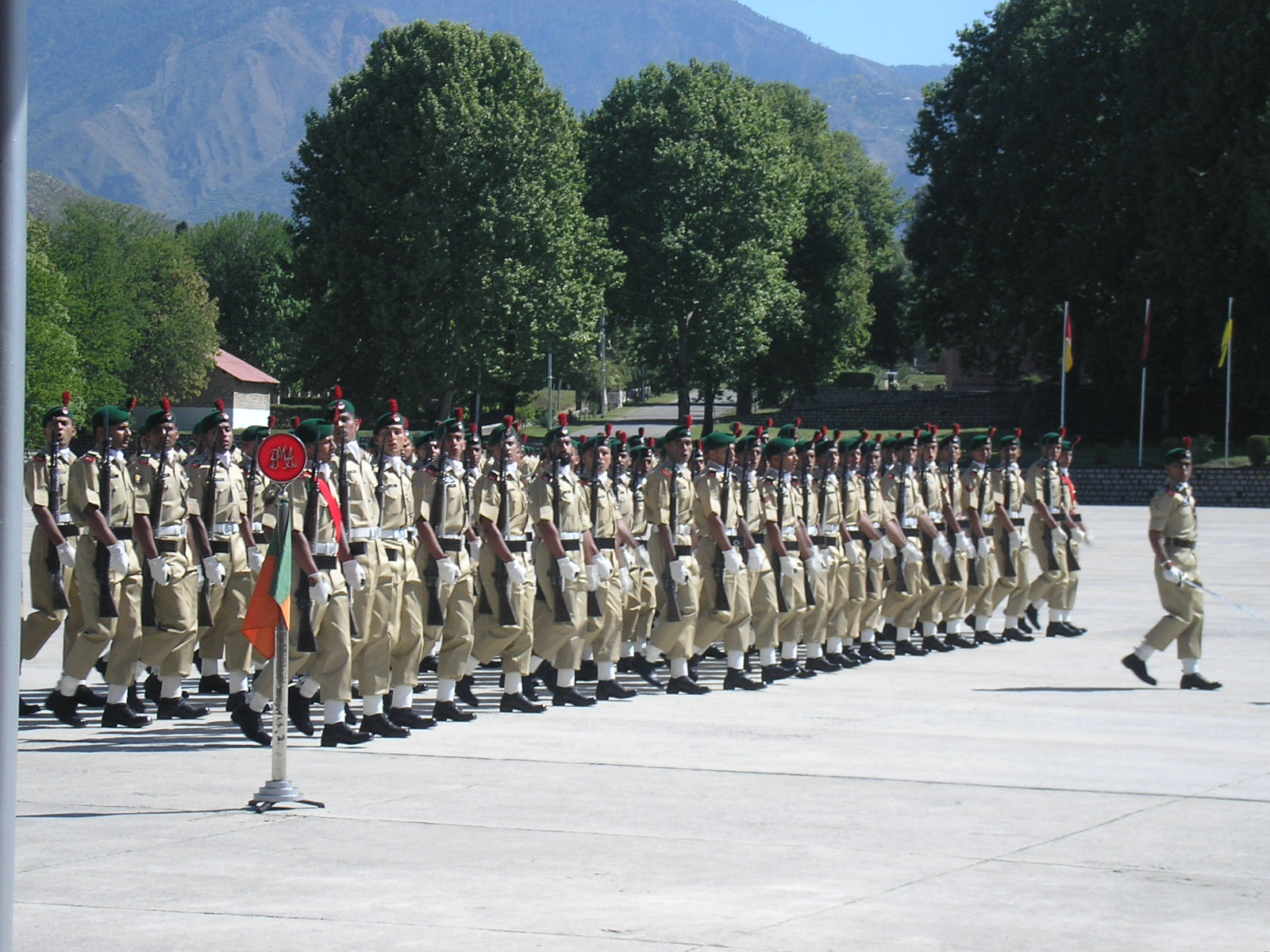
The passing out (graduation) of cadets from the Pakistan Military Academy in Kakul in 2007. The education and military training last for two years before cadets become officers.

Prior to August 1947, the British Army's recruiting administration had recruited the enlists from the districts of the Jhelum, Rawalpindi, and Campbellpur that dominated the recruitment flows. From 1947 to 1971, the Pakistan Army was predominantly favored to recruit from Punjab and was popular in the country as the "Punjabi Army" because of heavy recruiting interests coming from the rural and poor families of villages in Punjab as well as being the most populous province of Pakistan.

Even as of today, the Pakistan Army's recruiters struggle to enlist citizens and their selfless commitment to the military from the urban areas (i.e. Karachi and Peshawar) where the preference of the college education is quite popular (especially attending post-graduate schools in the United States and the English-speaking countries) as well as working in the settled private industry for lucrative salaries and benefits, while the military enlistment still comes from the most rural and remote areas of Pakistan, where commitment to the military is much greater than in the metropolitan cities.

After 1971, the Bhutto administration introduced the Quota system and drastically reduced the officers and enlists from Punjab and gave strong preference to residents in Sindh, Balochistan, and Khyber-Pakhtunkhwa, and such policy continue to exists to maintain an ethnic balance in the army. Those who are turned away are strongly encourage to join the Marines Corps or the Air Force.

In 1991, the department of the army drastically reduced the size of personnel from Punjab, downsizing the army personnel to 63%, and issues acceptable medical waivers interested enlists while encouraging citizens of Khyber-Pakhtunkhwa and Sindh. This decision has given a fair chance to every citizen of Pakistan to be part of the Pakistan Army as each district possesses a fixed percentage of seats in all branches of the Army, as per census records. By 2003–05, the department of army continued its policy by drastically downsizing the personnel from Punjab to 43–70%.

The Department of Army has relaxed its recruitment and medical standards in Sindh and Balochistan where the height requirement of 5 feet 4 inches is considered acceptable even with the enlists educational level at eighth grade is acceptable for the waiver; since the army recruiters take responsibility of providing education to 12th grade to the interested enlists from Balochistan and Sindh. In Punjab and Khyber-Pakhtunkhwa where the recruitment is popular, the height requirement remains to be at 5 feet 6 inches with minimum education of 10th grade.

The army cadets undergo training in Kakul at the Pakistan Military Academy where basic training takes place. Such training usually lasts for two years until the cadets are able to meet their graduation requirements from the academy. All the cadets have to attend and be trained at the PMA regardless of attending the military schools and colleges in other parts of the country.

Duration wise, it is one of the longest military training period in the country, and the training continues for two years until the cadet is being able pass out from the academy, before selecting the college to start the career of their choice in the military.

=== Women in the Pakistan Army ===
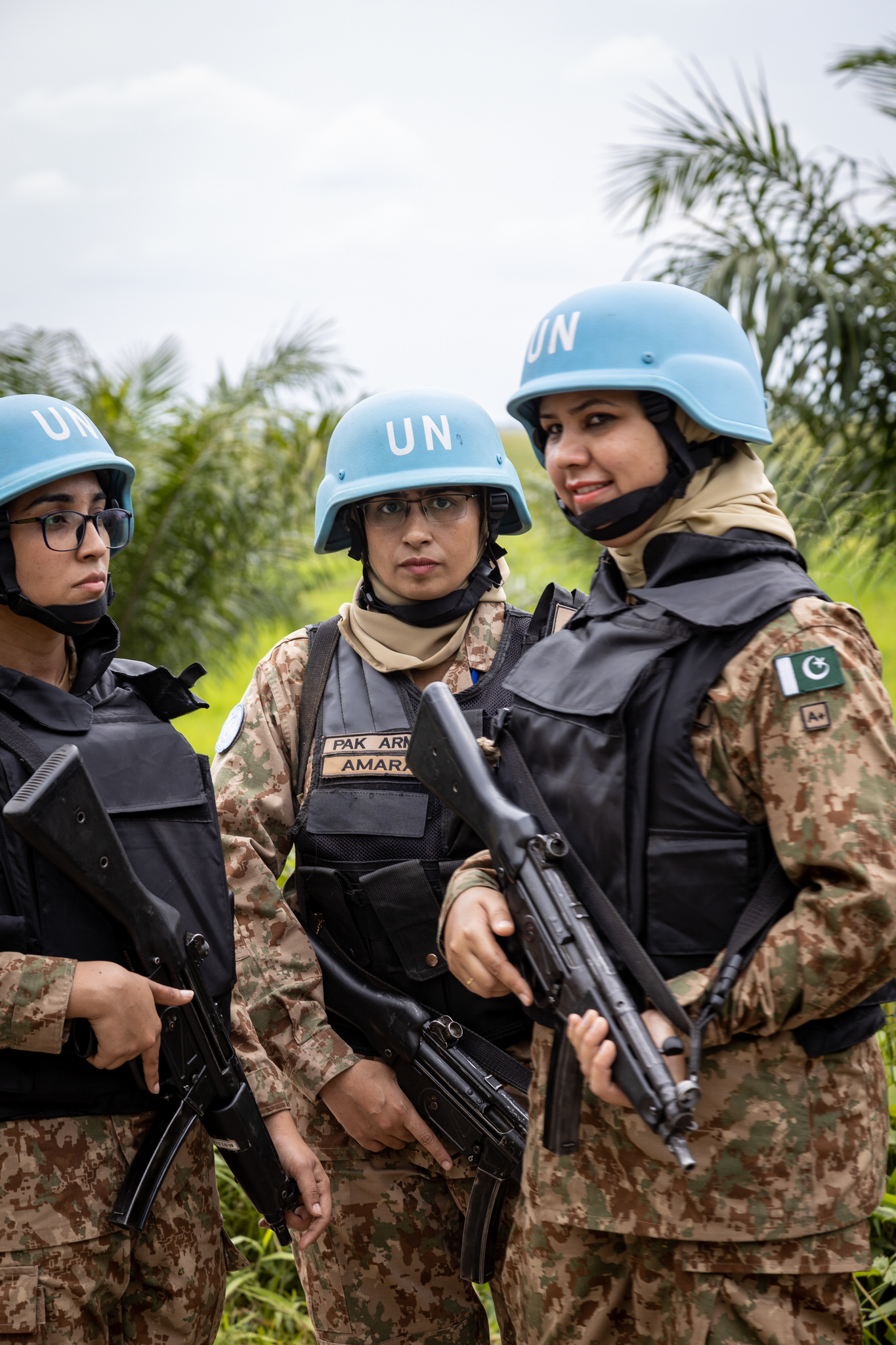
MONUSCO's Pakistani Female Engagement Team in Democratic Republic of the Congo

Women have been part of the Pakistan Army since 1947, and from the army's inception to 2018 approximately 4,000 women served the army though most women were doctors and civilians. In the years of 1947, '48 and '49, women were inducted into the Women's Guard Section of the National Guard and trained in medical work, welfare, and clerical positions (this was later disbanded). Pakistan Army has a separate cadet course for women which is known as 'Lady Cadet Course', female cadets are trained in Pakistan Military Academy. After induction, women army officers go through a six-month military training at the Pakistan Military Academy which is not like their male counterparts. The comprehensive training includes military education and development of physical efficiency skills.

Pakistan is the only Muslim-majority nation which appoints women to general officer ranks, such as Major-General Shahida Malik, the first woman army officer and military physician by profession who was promoted to a two-star rank. In July 2013, the Army trained female paratrooper officers for the first time. In 2020, Nigar Johar became the first female Lieutenant General in the army, she was from the Pakistan Army Medical Corps.

=== Religious minorities in Pakistan Army ===
The Army recruits from all religions in Pakistan including Hindus, Sikhs, Zoroastrians, Christians who have held command-level positions. Religious services are provided by the Chaplain Corps for Muslims, Hindus, Christians, Sikhs, and Zoroastrians.

In 1993, Major-General Julian Peter was the first Christian to be appointed at the command position while Hercharn Singh became the first Sikh to be commissioned in the army. Between 1947 and 2000, a policy of restricting Hindus prior enlisting in the Pakistan Army was in practice until the policy was reversed by the federal government. In 2006, army recruiters began recruiting Hindus into the army and people of all faith or no faith can be promoted to any rank or commanding position in the army. Pakistani Hindus have served in the Pakistan Armed Forces, with milestones including Captain Danish as the first Hindu officer commissioned in 2006, Major Dr Kelash Kumar and Major Dr Aneel Kumar as the first Hindu officers promoted to Lieutenant Colonel in 2022, and Dev Anand as the first Hindu pilot officer in the Pakistan Air Force in 2023. Three notable Pakistani Hindu martyrs include Heman Das Kohli, killed in the line of duty in 2023, Lance Naik Lal Chand Rabari, killed in the line of duty in 2017 and Ashok Kumar, posthumously awarded the Tamgha‑e‑Shujaat for bravery in Waziristan in 2013.

== Equipment ==
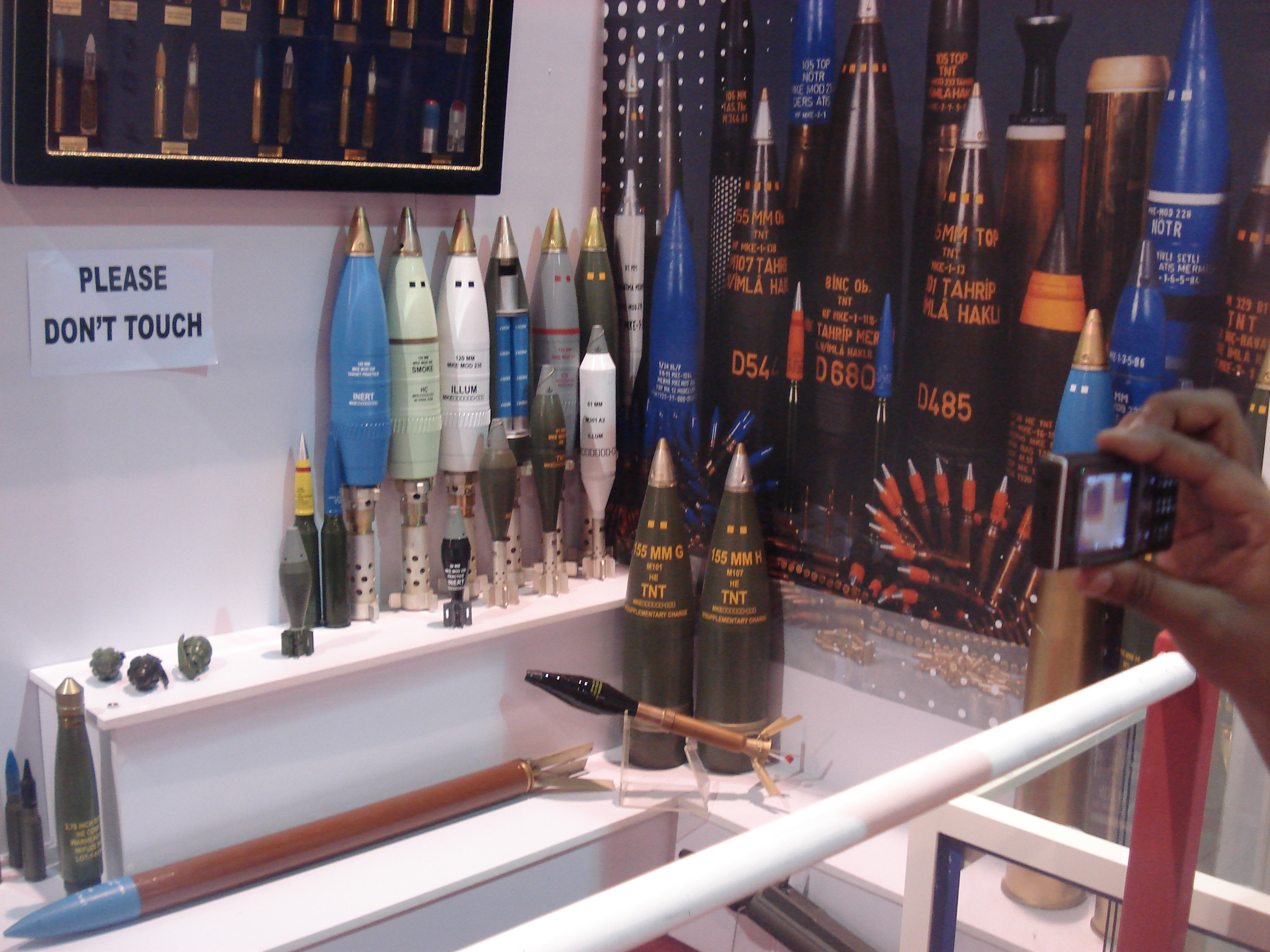
The ordnance and explosives produced by the Pakistan Ordnance Factories

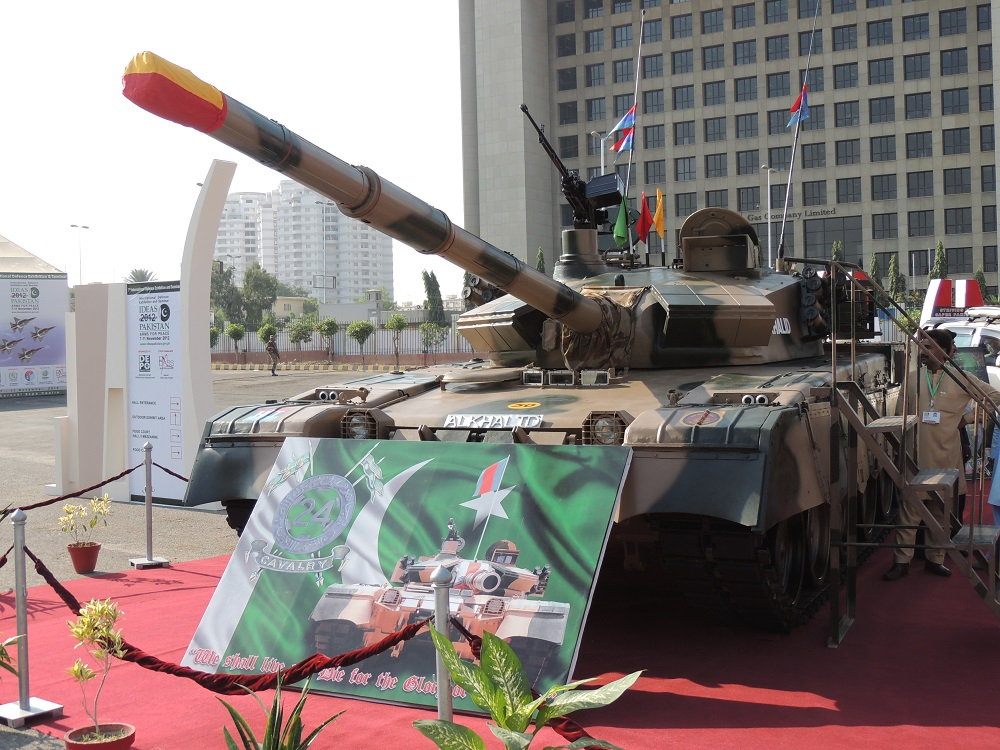
The Al-Khalid MBT designed and built by the HIT in Taxila

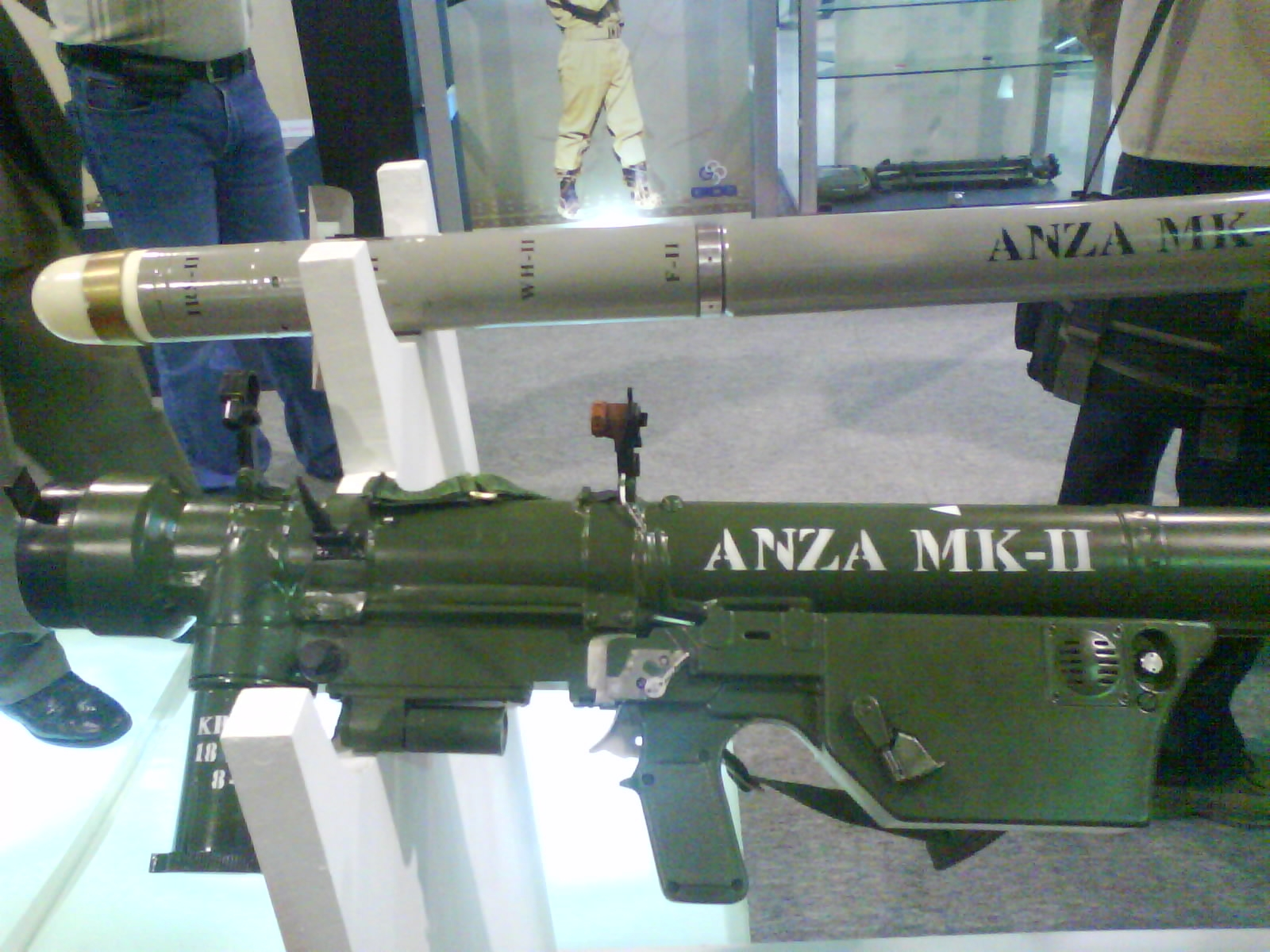
The Anza MANPAD designed and built by KRL

Weapon systems of Pakistan Army

The equipment and weapon system of Pakistan Army is developed and manufactured by the local weapons industry and modern arms have been imported from China, Turkey, United Kingdom, United States, France and other countries in the European Union.

The Heavy Industries Taxila (HIT), Pakistan Ordnance Factories (POF), National Radio and Telecommunication Corporation (NRTC) and the Pakistan Aeronautical Complex (PAC) are the major defense contractors for the Army. The industrial concern GIDS has also emerged as a major manufacturer of drones and other defence equipment.

The Heavy Industries Taxila designs and manufactured main battle tanks (MBT) in cooperation with the China and Ukraine, while the fire arms and standard rifles for the army are licensed manufactured by the Pakistan Ordnance Factories (POF). The Chinese cooperation and further assistance with the Pakistan Army is vital in designing, vehicular construction, and material manufacturing of the main battle tanks. The standard rifle for the army is the German designed and POF manufactured Koch G3P4.

The defense funding for the army was preferential, which was described as the "lion's share", however, in light of CPEC's security demanding to secure the seaborne borders, the army financial planners significantly lowered its share in a view of strengthening the under-funded Pakistan navy.

== Uniforms ==
From 1947 to 1971, the army service uniform of the Pakistan Army closely resembled to the army uniform of the British Army, but the uniform changed in preference of Sherwani. The army service uniform consists of a light khaki (tan) coloured long-sleeved shirt with matching trousers. It is accompanied by beret or peaked cap depending on the regiment the soldier belongs to. Organizational headwear, sashes, belts, spats, medals, lanyards, and other achievements are added for ceremonial duties. Unlike other countries in South Asia, Pakistan army officer uniforms don't include a aiguillette, rather it is used mostly by aid-de-camps. Senior officers wear a greenish-khaki stand-and-fall collared tunic, called the Sherwani, with two front pockets, cap of a synthetic material, trousers with two pockets.

In the 1970s, the Ministry of Defense introduced the first camouflage pattern in the army combat uniform, resembling the British-styled DPM but this was changed in 1990 in favor of adopting the U.S. Woodland which continued until 2010. In winter front such as in the Siachen and near the Wakhan Corridor, the Pakistan Army personnel wears the heavy winter all white military gear.

As of 2011, the camouflage pattern of the brown and black BDU was issued and is worn by the officers and the army troops in their times of deployments. The Pakistan Army has introduced arid camouflage patterns in uniform and resized qualification badges which are now service ribbons and no longer worn along with the ranks are now embroidered and are on the chest. The name is badged on the right pocket and the left pocket displays achievement badges by Pakistan Army.

Flag of Pakistan is placed over the black embroidered formation sign on the left arm and class course insignias are put up for the Goldish uniform, decorations and awards and the ranks.

Military Uniforms in the Pakistan Army
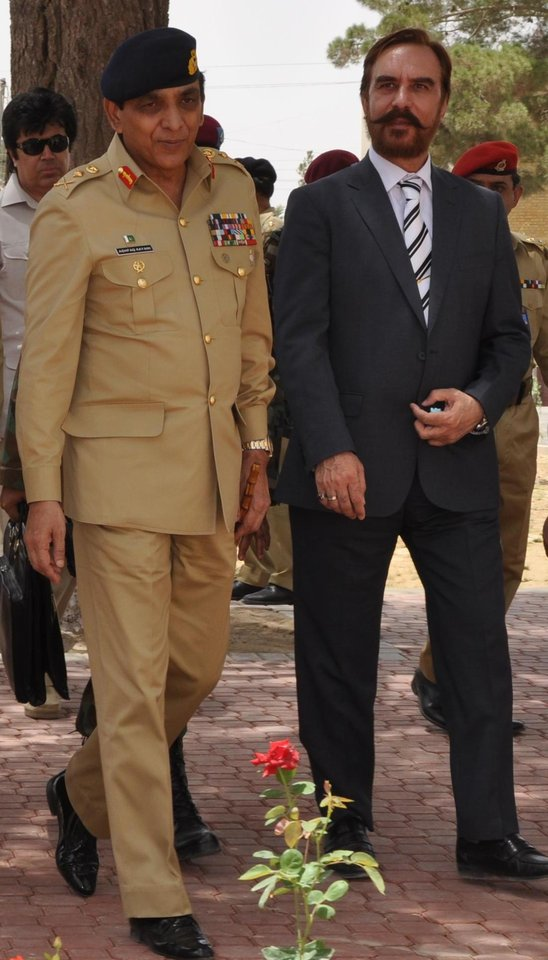
General Kayani wearing the standard Sherwani-based ceremonial uniform of the Pakistan Army

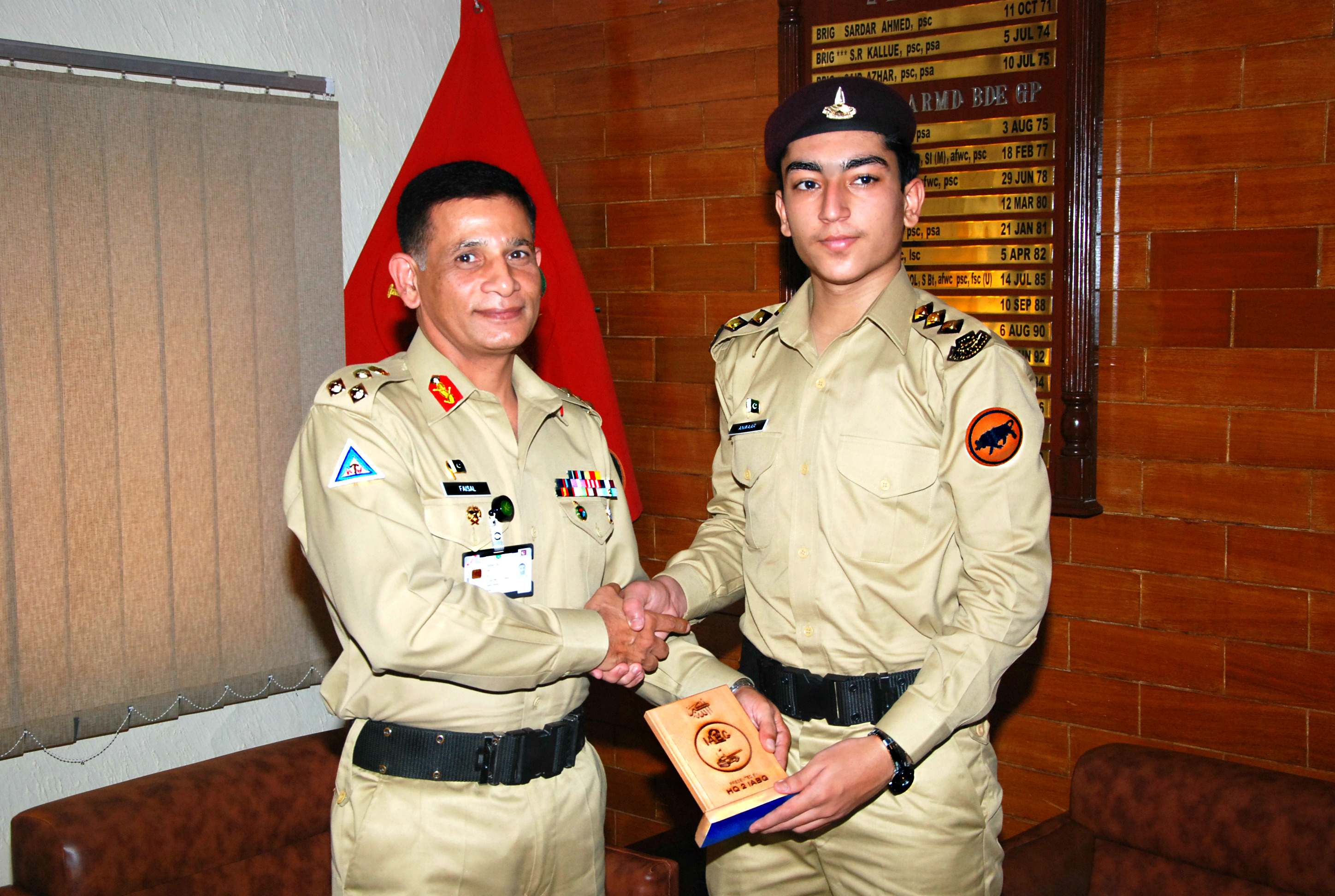
The standard army service uniform of the Pakistan Army, worn by officers and enlisted personnel

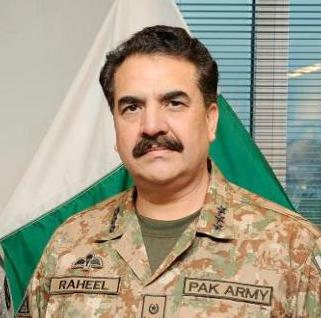
The former COAS, Gen. R. Sharif: The standard battle dress uniform of the Pakistan Army

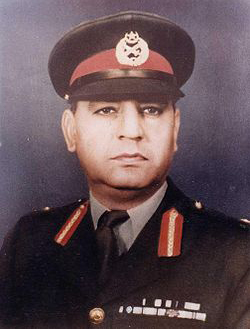
The army service uniform of the Pakistan Army closely resembled to the army uniform of the British Army as seen and active from 1947–1970s

== Components and structure ==
=== Army components and branches ===
Since the commencement of its organization in 1947, the army's functionality is broadly maintained in two main branches: Combat Arms and Administrative Services. From 1947 to 1971, the Pakistan Army had the responsibility of maintaining the British-built forts till the new and modern garrisons were built after 1971 and performing non-combat duties such as engineering and construction.

Currently, the Army's combat services consist of active-duty personnel and reservists that operate as members of the National Guard and the paramilitary Civil Armed Forces. The latter includes the Frontier Corps and the Pakistan Rangers, which often perform military police duties for the provincial governments in Pakistan to help control and manage the law and control situation.

The two main branches of the army, Combat Arms and Administrative Services, also consist of several branches and functional areas that include the army officers, junior commissioned (or warrant officers), and the enlisted personnel who are classified from their branches in their uniforms and berets. In Pakistan Army, the careers are not restricted to military officials but are extended to civilian personnel and contractors who can progress in administrative branches of the army.

Pakistan Army branches and functional areas
Combined Arms	Insignia	Administrative Services	Insignia
Armoured Corps (AC)		Service Corps (ASC)	
Air Defence (AD)		Military Police (MP)	
Aviation Corps (AVN)		Electrical and Mechanical Engineering (EME)	
Artillery Corps (ARTY)		Medical (AMC)	
Signals Corps (SIGS)		Education (AEC)	
Engineers Corps (ENG)		Remount Veterinary and Farms (RVFC)	
Infantry Regiments (INF)		Ordnance (ORD)	
Special Forces (SSG)		Military Intelligence (MI)	

=== Command structure ===
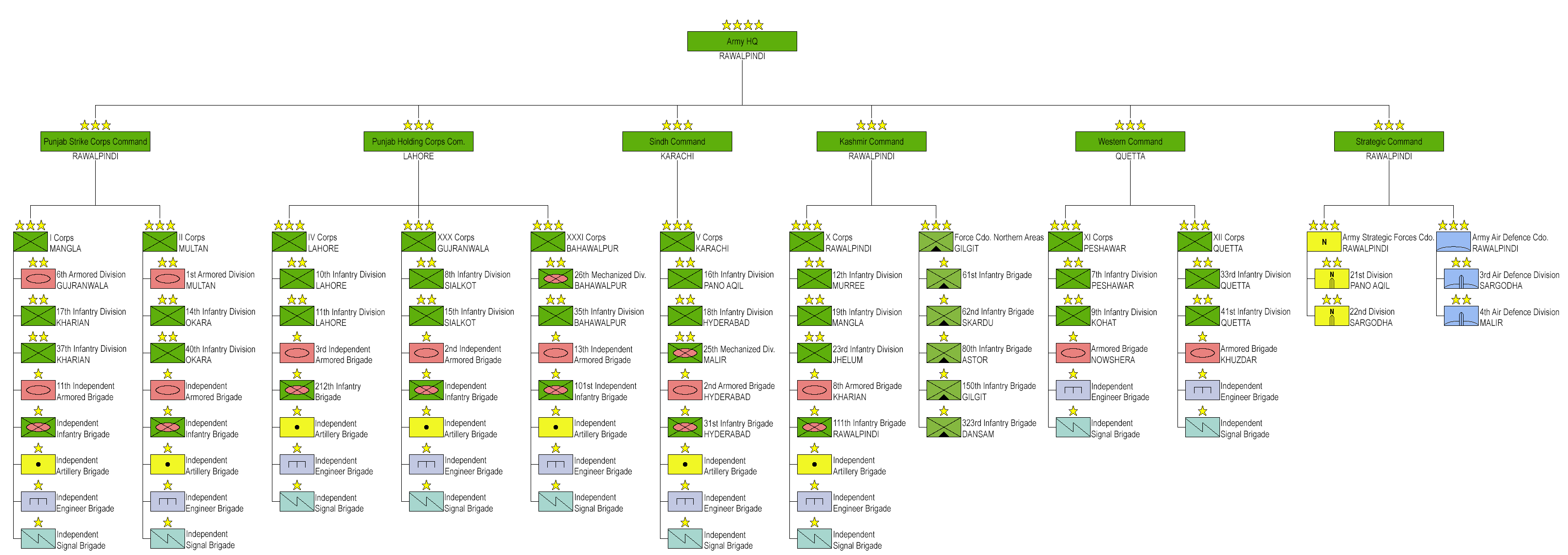
The command and control structure of the six tactical operational commands in the Pakistan Army

The reorganization of the position standing army in 2008, the Pakistan Army now operates six tactical commands, each commanded by the GOC-in-C, with a holding three-star rank: Lieutenant-General. Each of the six tactical commands directly reports to the office of Chief of Army Staff, operating directly at the Army GHQ. Each command consists of two or more Corps– an army field formation responsible for zone within a command theater.

There are nine active Corps in the Pakistan Army, composing of mixed infantry, mechanized, armored, artillery divisions, while the Air Defense, Aviation, and the Aviation and Special Forces are organized and maintained in the separate level of their commands.

Established and organized in March 2000, the Army Strategic Forces Command is exercise its authority for responsible training in safety, weapons deployments, and activation of the atomic missile systems.

=== Combat maneuvering organizations ===
The map of Five Rivers. The strategic reserves of Pakistan including the desert and forest.

In events involving the large and massive foreign invasion by the Indian Army charging towards the Pakistan-side Punjab sector, the Pakistan Army maintains the "Pakistan Army Reserves" as a strategic reserve component for conducting the offense and defense measures against the advancing enemy.

=== Infantry branch ===
Since its establishment in 1947, the Pakistan Army has traditionally followed the British regimental system and culture, and currently there are six organized infantry regiments.

In the infantry branch, there are originally six regiments are in fact the administrative military organization that are not combat field formation, and the size of the regiments are vary as their rotation and deployments including assisting the federal government in civic administration.

In each of original six regiments, there are multiple battalions that are associated together to form an infantry regiment and such battalions do not fight together as one formation as they are all deployed over various formations in shape of being part of the brigade combat team (under a Brigadier), division, or a being part of much larger corps.

After the independence from the Great Britain in 1947, the Pakistan Army begin to follow the U.S. Army's standing formation of their Infantry Branch, having the infantry battalion serving for a time period under a different command zone before being deployed to another command zone, usually in another sector or terrain when its tenure is over.

Infantry branch
The Infantry Regiments by seniority	Insignia	Activation Date	Commanding Regimental Center	Motto	War Cry
Punjab Regiment		1759	Mardan, Khyber-Pakhtunkhwa		Urdu: نارا-یا-حیدری یا علی (English lit. Ali the Great)
Baloch Regiment		1798	Abbottabad, Khyber-Pakhtunkhwa	غازی یا شہید (English lit. Honoured or Martyr)	کی کی بلوچ (English lit. Of the Baloch)
Frontier Force Regiment		1843	Abbottabad, Khyber-Pakhtunkhwa	لبّیک (English lit. Lucky)	
Northern Light Infantry Regiment		1913	Gilgit, Gilgit Baltistan	سبط قدم (English lit. Consistent)	
Azad Kashmir Regiment		1947	Mansar, Punjab		
Sind Regiment		1980	Hyderabad, Sindh		
Mujahid Force Regiment		2019	Bhimber, Azad Kashmir	جہاد فی سبیل اللہ Jihad fi-Sabilillah	

=== Special operations forces ===
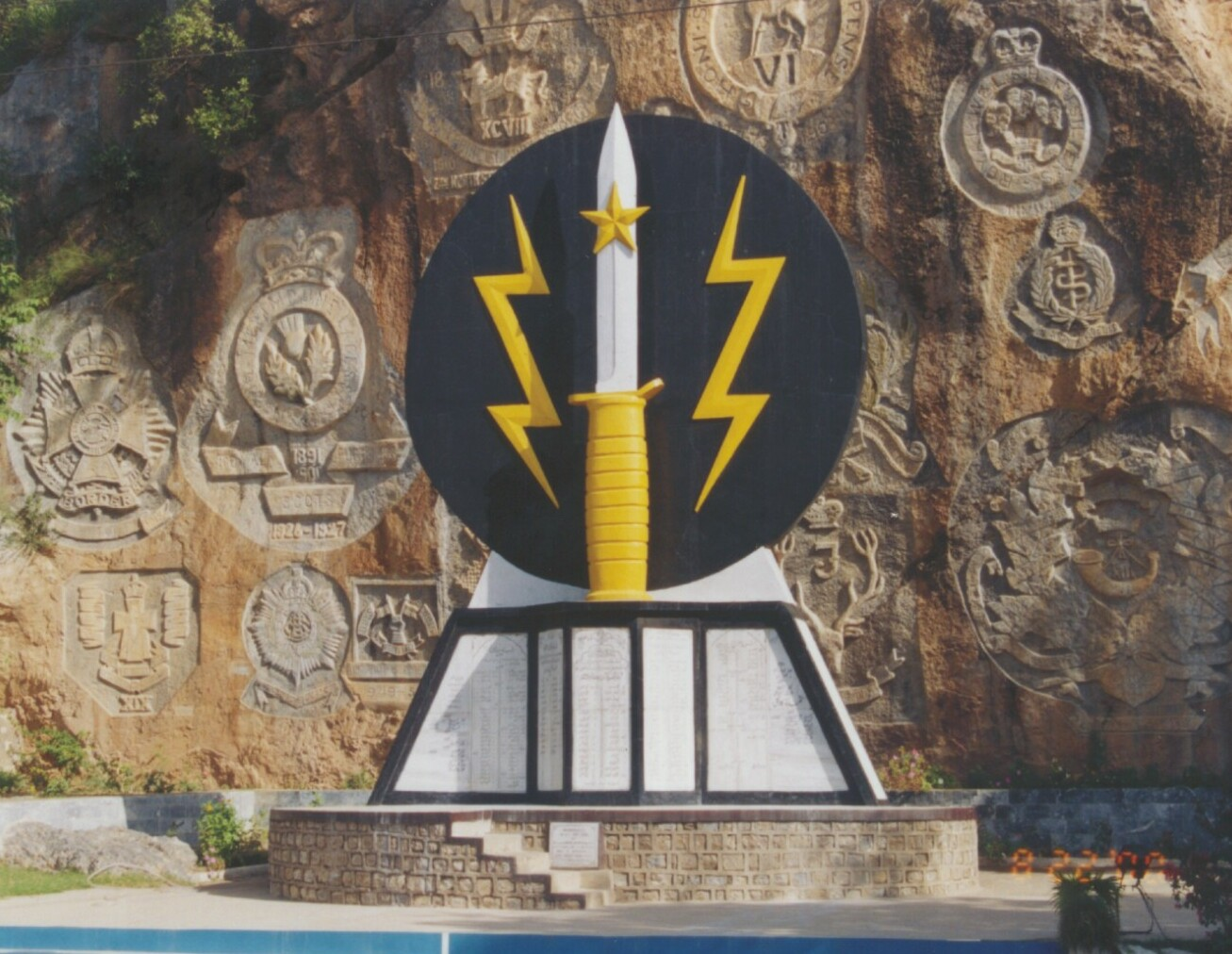
The logo of the Army's SSG where the Special Forces and Light Commandos are trained together

The Pakistan Army has a division dedicated towards conducting the unconventional and asymmetric warfare operations, established with the guidance provided by the United States Army in 1956. This competitive special operation force is known as the Special Services Group (Army SSG, distinguishing the Navy SSG), and is assembled in eight battalions, commanded by the Lieutenant-Colonel, with addition of three companies commanded by the Major or a Captain, depending on the availability.

The special operation forces training school is located in Cherat in Khyber Pakhtunkhwa.

Each battalion in the Pakistan Army Special Forces is specifically trained for a specific type of operation, and each battalion is a specialist in their nature of conducting the operation. Due to their distinctive service headgear, the Army SSG is colloquially known as the Maroon Berets.

== Military philosophy ==
Since the 1960s, officers of the Pakistan Armed Forces have produced a significant body of autobiographical and analytical writings, continuing a tradition established by officers of the colonial Indian Army. Studies of this literature note that by 2011 more than 60 military authors had published nearly 100 titles, ranging from personal memoirs to accounts of military operations and political events. Some of these works became widely circulated and were reprinted multiple times, while others were self-published and distributed through local book markets. Scholars observe that these writings form an important part of the historiography of Pakistan and its military, as they provide firsthand perspectives on major events such as the Indo-Pakistani wars and the political role of the armed forces.

=== Combat doctrine (1947–2007) ===
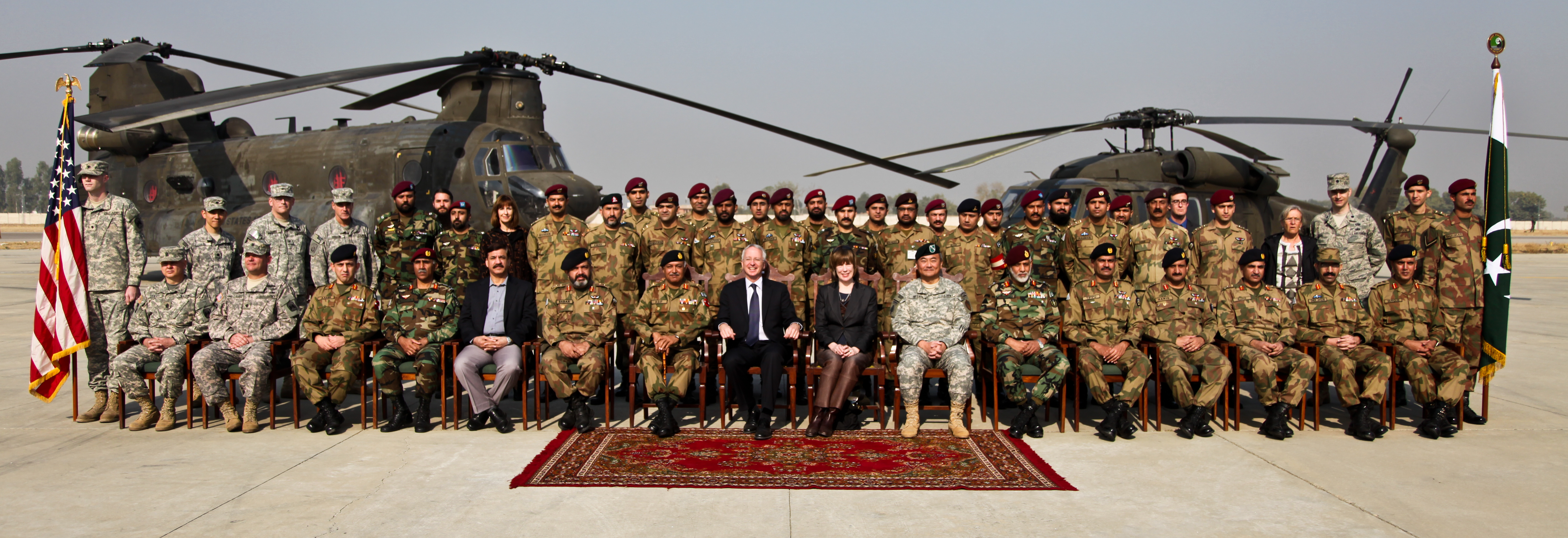
The U.S.-Pakistan military relations: The group photo of the United States Army and the Pakistan Army after coordinating the joint operation in 2010.

In 1947, the Pakistan Army's war strategists developed a combat doctrine which was called "The Riposte", which featured a strategy of "offensive-defense". In 1989, the first and official implementation of this strategy was refined and featured in the major military exercise, Exercise Zab-e-Momin, organized under Lt-Gen. Hamid Gul– this combat doctrine was fully focused in engaging towards its primary adversary, Indian Army.

In 1989–99, the JS HQ, working with the Army GHQ to identify several key factors considering the large conventional attacks from the better equipped and numerically advantage adversary, the Indian Army, derived the combat doctrine to assess the vulnerability of Pakistan where its vast majority of population centers as well as political and military targets lies closer to the international border with India.

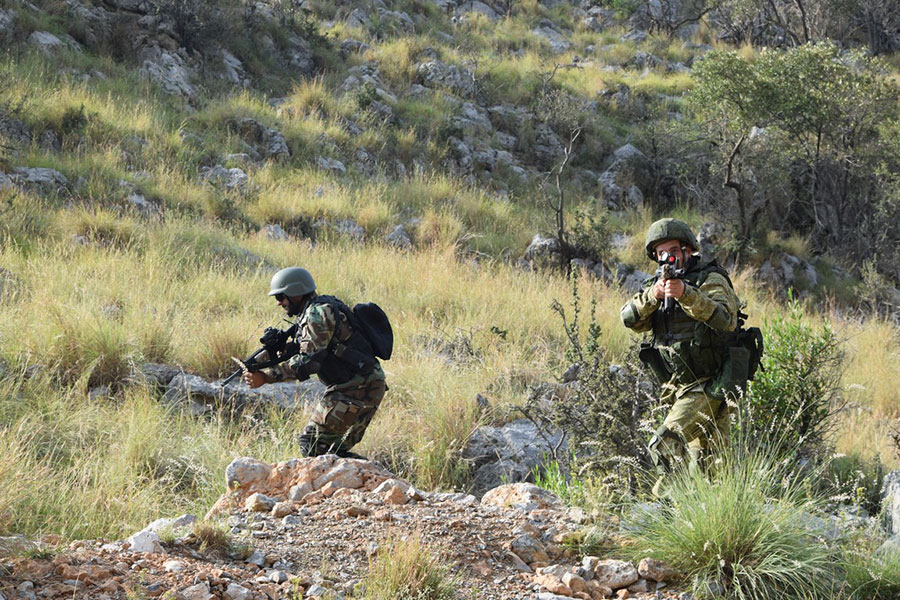
The Pakistan Army's special forces soldiers in a drill conducting jointly with the Russian special forces in 2016

The national security strategists explored the controversial idea of strategic depth in form of fomenting friendly foreign relations with Afghanistan and Iran while India substantially enhancing its offensive capabilities designed in its doctrine, the Cold Start Doctrine. Due to the numerical advantage of Indian Army over its smaller adversary, the Pakistan Army, the Pakistani national security analysts noted that any counterattack on advancing Indian Army would be very tricky and miscalculated – the ideal response of countering the attacks from the Indian ground forces would be operationalizing the battle-ranged Hatf-IA/Hatf-IB missiles. In times of national emergency, the Pakistan Army Reserves, supported by the National Guard and Civil Armed Forces, would likely be deployed to reinforce defensive positions and fortifications. However, after the orders are authorized the Corps in both nation's will take between 24 and 72 hours to completely mobilize their combat assets. Therefore, both nation's armies will be evenly matched in the first 24 hours since the Pakistani units have to travel a shorter distance to their forward positions.

Pakistan's military doctrine emphasizes a proactive defense, also referred to as "offensive-defense". This strategy prioritizes seizing the initiative in a conflict and launching limited counteroffensives to preempt potential enemy advances. Proponents of Pakistan's "offensive-defense" doctrine argue that it offers several advantages. One key benefit is the potential to disrupt an enemy's offensive plans, forcing them to shift focus from their initial attack to defending their own territory. This could place Pakistan in a more favorable position by dictating the terms of engagement on the battlefield. The strategic calculations by Pakistan Army's war strategists hope that the Pakistan Army's soldiers would keep the Indian Army engaged in fighting on the Indian territory, therefore the collateral damage being suffered by the Indian Army will be higher. Pakistani planners also estimate that since Indian forces will not be able to reach their maximum strength near the border for another 48–72 hours, Pakistan might have parity or numerical superiority against India. An important aspect in "offensive-defense" doctrine was to seize sizable Indian territory which gives Pakistan an issue to negotiate with India in the aftermath of a possible ceasefire brought about by the international pressure after 3–4 weeks of fighting.

Due to fortification of LoC in Kashmir and difficult terrains in Northern Punjab, the Army created the Pakistan Army Reserves in the 1990s that is concentrated in the desert terrain of Sindh-Rajasthan sector, The Army Reserve South of the Pakistan Army Reserves is grouped in several powerful field-level corps and designed to provide defensive maneuvers in case of war with the Indian Army.

=== Threat Matrix (2010–present) ===
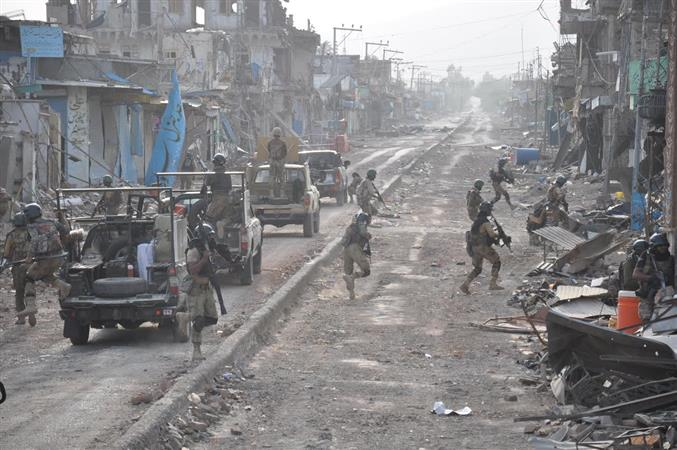
Urban warfare near Afghanistan: Pakistan Army infantry troops engage in door-to-door clearance during N. Waziristan offense in 2016.

After the failure of the "Offensive-defense" in 1999, the national security institutions engaged in critical thinking to evaluate new doctrine that would provide a comprehensive grand strategy against the infiltrating enemy forces, and development began 2010–11 for the new combat doctrine. In 2013, the new combat doctrine, the Threat Matrix, was unveiled by the ISPR, that was the first time in its history that the army's national security analysts realized that Pakistan faces a real threat from within, a threat that is concentrated in areas along western borders. The Threat Matrix doctrine analyze the military's comprehensive operational priorities and goes beyond in comprehensively describing both existential and non-existential threats to the country.

Based on that strategy in 2013, the Pakistani military organized a four-tier joint military exercise, code-named: Exercise Azm-e-Nau, in which the aim was to update the military's "readiness strategy for dealing with the complex security threat environment." The objective of such exercises is to assess tactics, procedures, and techniques, and explore joint operations strategies involving all three branches of the military: the Army, Air Force, and Navy. In successive years, the Pakistani military combined all the branch-level exercises into joint warfare exercises, in which all four branches now participate, regardless of the terrain, platforms, and control of command.

== Education and training ==
=== Schooling, teachings, and institutions ===
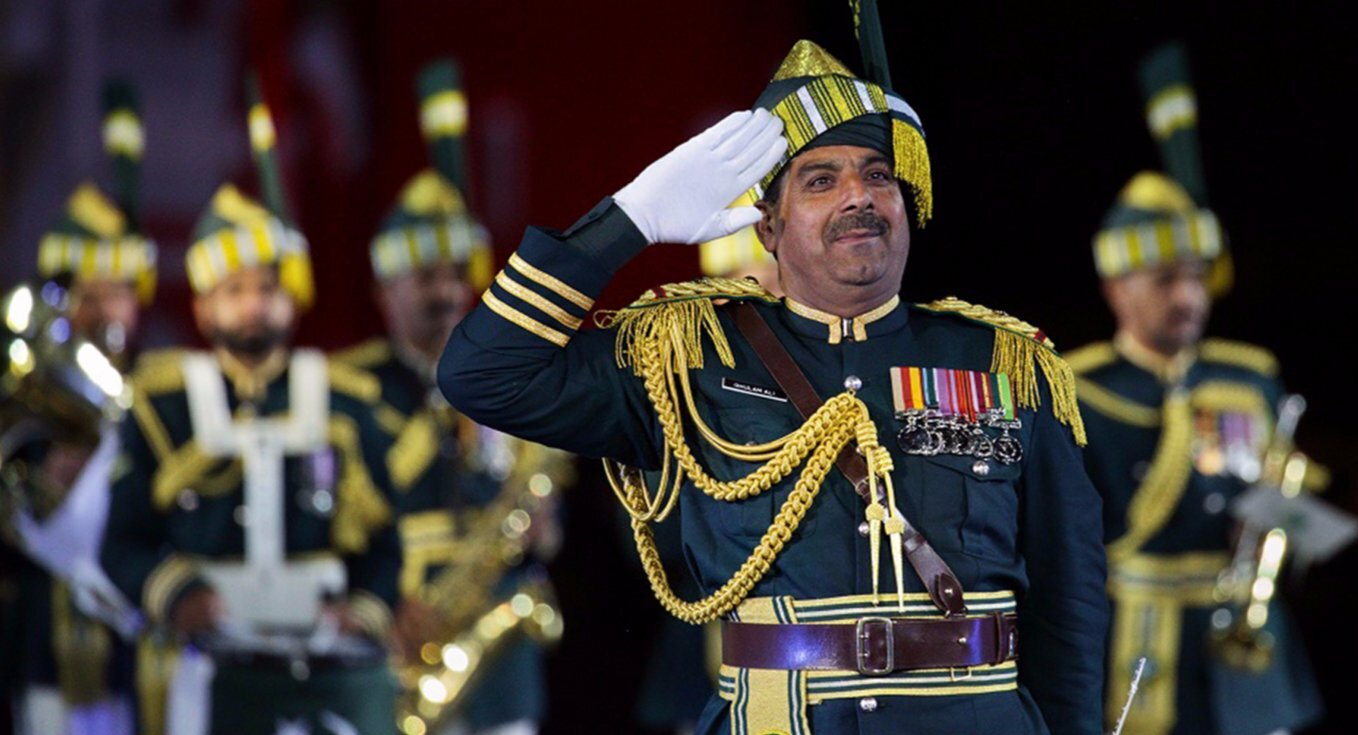
The Pakistan Army Music band's conductor saluting after the performance in Russia

The Pakistan Army offers wide range of extensive and lucrative careers in the military to young high school graduates and the college degree holders upon enlistment, and Pakistan Army operates the large number of training schools in all over the country. The overall directions and management of the army training schools are supervised and controlled by the policies devised by the Education Corps, and philosophy on instructions in army schools involves in modern education with combat training.

At the time of its establishment of the Pakistan Army in 1947, the Command and Staff College in Quetta was inherited to Pakistan, and is the oldest college established during the colonial period in India in 1905. The British officers in the Pakistan Army had to established the wide range of schools to provide education and to train the army personnel in order to raise the dedicated and professional army. The wide range of military officers in the Pakistani military were sent to attend the staff colleges in the United States, United Kingdom, Australia, and Canada who were trained and excelled in courses in armory, infantry, artillery, and ordnance in 1950–1961.

The United States eventually took over the overall training programs in the Pakistan Army under the International Military Education and Training (IMET) but the U.S. coordination with Pakistan varied along with the vicissitudes of the military relations between two countries. In the 1980s, the army had sent ~200 army officers abroad annually, two-thirds actually decided to attend schooling in the United States but the cessation of the United States' aid to Pakistan led the suspension of the IMET, leading Pakistani military officers to choose the schooling in the United Kingdom.

After the terrorist attacks in the United States in 2001, the IMET cooperation was again activated with army officers begin attending the schooling in the United States but the training program was again suspended in 2018 by the Trump administration, leveling accusations on supporting armed Jihadi groups in Afghanistan.

During the reconstruction and reorganization of the armed forces in the 1970s, the army established more training schools as below:

Army schools and colleges	Year of establishment	School and college principal locations	Website
School of Armour and Mechanized Warfare	1947	Nowshera in Khyber-Pakhtunkhwa	"School of Armour and Mechanized Warfare". Archived from the original on 3 January 2019.
School of Artillery	1948	Kakul in Khyber-Pakhtunkhwa	"School of Artillery". Archived from the original on 3 January 2019.
School of Army Air Defense	1941	Karachi in Sindh	"School of Army Air Defence". Archived from the original on 21 January 2019.
Military College of Engineering	1947	Risalpur in Khyber-Pakhtunkhwa	"Military College of Engineering". Archived from the original on 21 January 2019.
Military College of Signals	1947	Rawalpindi in Punjab	"Military College of Signals". Archived from the original on 21 January 2019.
School of Infantry and Tactics	1947	Quetta in Balochistan	"School of Infantry and Tactics". Archived from the original on 3 January 2019.
Aviation School	1964	Gujranwala in Punjab	"Army Aviation School". Archived from the original on 3 January 2019.
Service Corps School	1947	Nowshera in Khyber Pakhtunkhwa	"Army Service Corps School". Archived from the original on 20 January 2019.
Army Desert Warfare School	1977	Rawalpindi in Punjab	"Army Medical College". Archived from the original on 21 January 2019.
Ordnance College	1980	Karachi in Sindh	"Ordnance College". Archived from the original on 3 January 2019.
College of Electrical and Mechanical Engineering	1957	Rawalpindi in Punjab	"College of Electrical and Mechanical Engineering". Archived from the original on 21 January 2019.
Special warfare and skills schools	Year of establishment	School and college principal locations	Website
Special Operations School	1956	Cherat in Khyber-Pakhtunkhwa	"Special Operations School".
Parachute Training School	1964	Kakul in Khyber-Pakhtunkhwa	"Parachute Training School". Archived from the original on 20 January 2019.
Corps of Military Police School	1949	D.I. Khan in Khyber-Pakhtunkhwa	"Corps of Military Police School". Archived from the original on 21 January 2019.
School of Logistics	1974	Murree in Punjab	"Army School of Logistics". Archived from the original on 2 August 2019.
School of Mountain Warfare and Physical Training	1978	Kakul in Khyber-Pakhtunkhwa	"Army School of Mountain Warfare and Physical Training". Archived from the original on 21 January 2019.
High Altitude School	1987	Rattu in Gilgit-Baltistan	"Army High Altitude School". Archived from the original on 21 January 2019.
Army Desert Warfare School	1987	Chor in Sindh	"Army Desert Warfare School".
School of Music	1970	Abbottabad in Khyber Pakhtunkhwa	"Army School of Music". Archived from the original on 21 January 2019.
Dog Breeding Training Center and School	1952	Rawalpindi in Punjab	"Army Dog Breeding Training Centre and School". Archived from the original on 21 January 2019.
Veterinary School	1947	Sargodha in Punjab	"Army Veterinary School" (PDF). Archived from the original (PDF) on 21 January 2019.
Higher education institutions	Year of establishment	Locations	Website
Command and Staff College	1905	Quetta in Balochistan	"Command and Staff College". Archived from the original on 21 January 2019.
National Defense University	1971	Islamabad	"National Defense University". Archived from the original on 21 January 2019.
National University of Sciences and Technology	1991	Multiple campuses	"National University of Sciences and Technology". Archived from the original on 23 October 2020.

Sources: Army Schools and Skills Schools of Pakistan Army

The Pakistan Army's training schools are not restricted to the department of the army only but inter-services officers and personnel have been trained and educated as part of the interdepartmental cooperation. The Pakistan Army takes responsibility of providing the military training and education to Pakistan Marines at their School of Infantry and Tactics, and military officers in other branches have attended and qualified psc from the Command and Staff College in Quetta. Officers holding the ranks of captains, majors, lieutenants and lieutenant-commanders in marines are usually invited to attend the courses at the Command and Staff College in Quetta to be qualified as psc.

Established in 1971, the National Defense University (NDU) in Islamabad is the senior and higher education learning institution that provides the advance critical thinking level and research-based strategy level education to the senior military officers in the Pakistani military. The NDU in Islamabad is a significant institution of higher learning in understanding the institutional norms of military tutelage in Pakistan because it constitutes the "highest learning platform where the military leadership comes together for common instruction", according to thesis written by Pakistani author Aqil Shah. Without securing their graduation from their master's program, no officer in the Pakistani military can be promoted as general in the army or air force, or admiral in the navy as it is a prerequisite for their promotion to become a senior member at the Joint Chiefs of Staff Committee.

Besides, the platform provided at the NDU in Islamabad represents a radical shift from the emphasis on operational and staff functions and the level of ranks are imposed as a qualification to attend the master's program at the NDU, usually brigadiers, air commodores, and commodores, are invited to given admission in a broad range of strategic, political, social, and economic factors as these factors affect the country's national security. In this sense, the NDU becomes the critical thinking institution as its constitutes active-duty senior military officers corps' baptism into a shared ideological framework about the military's appropriate role, status, and behavior in relation to state and society, and shared values affect how these officers perceive and respond to civilian governmental decisions, policies, and political crises. Admissions to the army's military engineering colleges and NDU is not restricted to military officials but the civilians can also attend and graduate from the NDU, allowing the civilians to explore the broader aspects of national security.

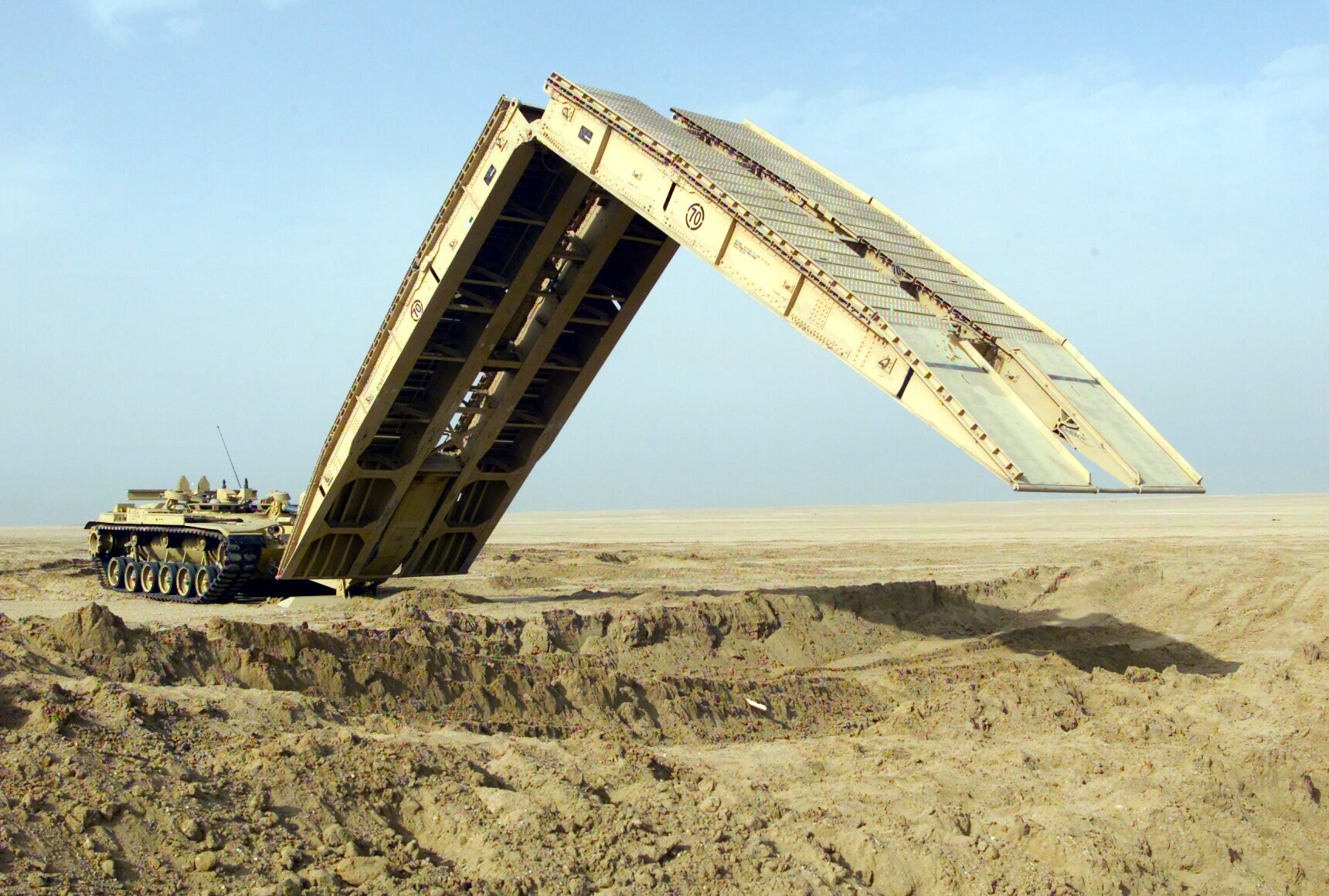
The M60 AVLB, the engineering vehicle currently inventory in Pakistan Army

Established in 1991, the National University of Sciences and Technology (NUST) has now absorbed and amalgamated the existing military colleges of engineering, signals, aeronautical, medical and is a counterpart institution in science and technology to that of the National Defense University (NDU) in Islamabad.

The foreign military officials and students, including from the United States, have attended the Command and Staff College in Quetta and the National Defense University (NDU) in Islamabad but the American instructors and observers have penned critical analysis by reporting the curriculum offered by the Command and Staff College in Quetta to be narrow focus and failure to encourage speculative thinking or to give adequate attention to less glamorous subjects, such as logistics.

== Civil engineering and construction ==
Since the 1970s, the Pakistan Army's engineering formations have been involved in civil engineering of the important landmarks in the country, hydroelectricity, power generation, dams, and national freeways.

The Pakistan Army has built major civil engineering landmarks in the country, including the Karakoram Highway, Skardu Airport, and the national security sites in Kahuta. The Frontier Works Organization of the army has built several infrastructure projects with the Corps of Engineers all over the country, and has built the communications lines in Northern Pakistan through its Special Communications Organization (SCO).

The Corps of Engineers are the major civil engineering contractor and engineering consultant employed by the federal government, advising on construction management and improving the efficiency of construction measures in times of natural calamities.

The Pakistan Army's landmark civil engineering projects included the Lyari Expressway in Karachi, Makran Coastal Highway in Balochistan and the Khanpur Dam in Khyber Pakhtunkhwa. Besides their infrastructure projects in Pakistan, the Pakistan Army has built several infrastructures projects in other parts of the world as part of their deployment in the United Nations peacekeeping missions.

== UN peacekeeping missions ==
In the wake of the new world power equilibrium, a more complex security environment has emerged. It's characterized by growing national power politics.

- UN Operation in Congo (ONUC) 1960–1964
- UN Security Force in New Guinea, West Irian (UNSF) 1962–1963 (14 Punjab Regiment)
- UN Yemen Observer Mission Yemen (UNYOM) 1963–1964
- UN Transition Assistance Group in Namibia (UNTAG) 1989–1990
- UN Iraq–Kuwait Observer Mission (UNIKOM) 1991–2003
- UN Mission in Haiti (UNMIH) 1993–1996
- UN Transitional Authority in Cambodia (UNTAC) 1992–1993
- UN Operations in Somalia (UNOSOM) 1992–1995
- UN Protection Forces in Bosnia (UNPROFOR) 1992–1995
- UN Observer Mission for Rwanda (UNAMIR) 1993–1996
- UN Verification Mission in Angola (UNAVEM III) 1995–1997
- UN Transitional Administration for Eastern Slavonia (UNTAES) 1996–1997
- UN Mission of Observers in Prevlaka (UNMOP) 1996–2002
- UN Assistance Mission in Sierra Leone (UNAMSIL) 2001–2005
- UN Transitional Administration in East Timor (UNTAET) 1999–present
- UN Interim Administration Mission in Kosovo (UNMIK) 1999–present

Current deployment in UN peacekeeping missions
Start of operation	Name of operation	Location	Conflict	Contribution
1999	United Nations Organization Stabilization Mission in the Democratic Republic of the Congo (MONUSCO)	Democratic Republic of Congo	Second Congo War	3,556 troops
2003	United Nations Mission in Liberia (UNMIL)	Liberia	Second Liberian Civil War	2,741 troops
2004	United Nations Operation in Burundi ONUB	Burundi	Burundi Civil War	1,185 troops
2004	United Nations Operation in Côte d'Ivoire (UNOCI)	Côte d'Ivoire	Civil war in Côte d'Ivoire	1,145 troops
2005	United Nations Mission in the Sudan (UNMIS)	Sudan	Second Sudanese Civil War	1,542 troops
	Staff/observers			191 observers

- The total number of Pakistani troops serving in peacekeeping missions is 7,533, as of August 2015, which is one of the biggest number among rest of participants.

== Involvement in Pakistani society ==
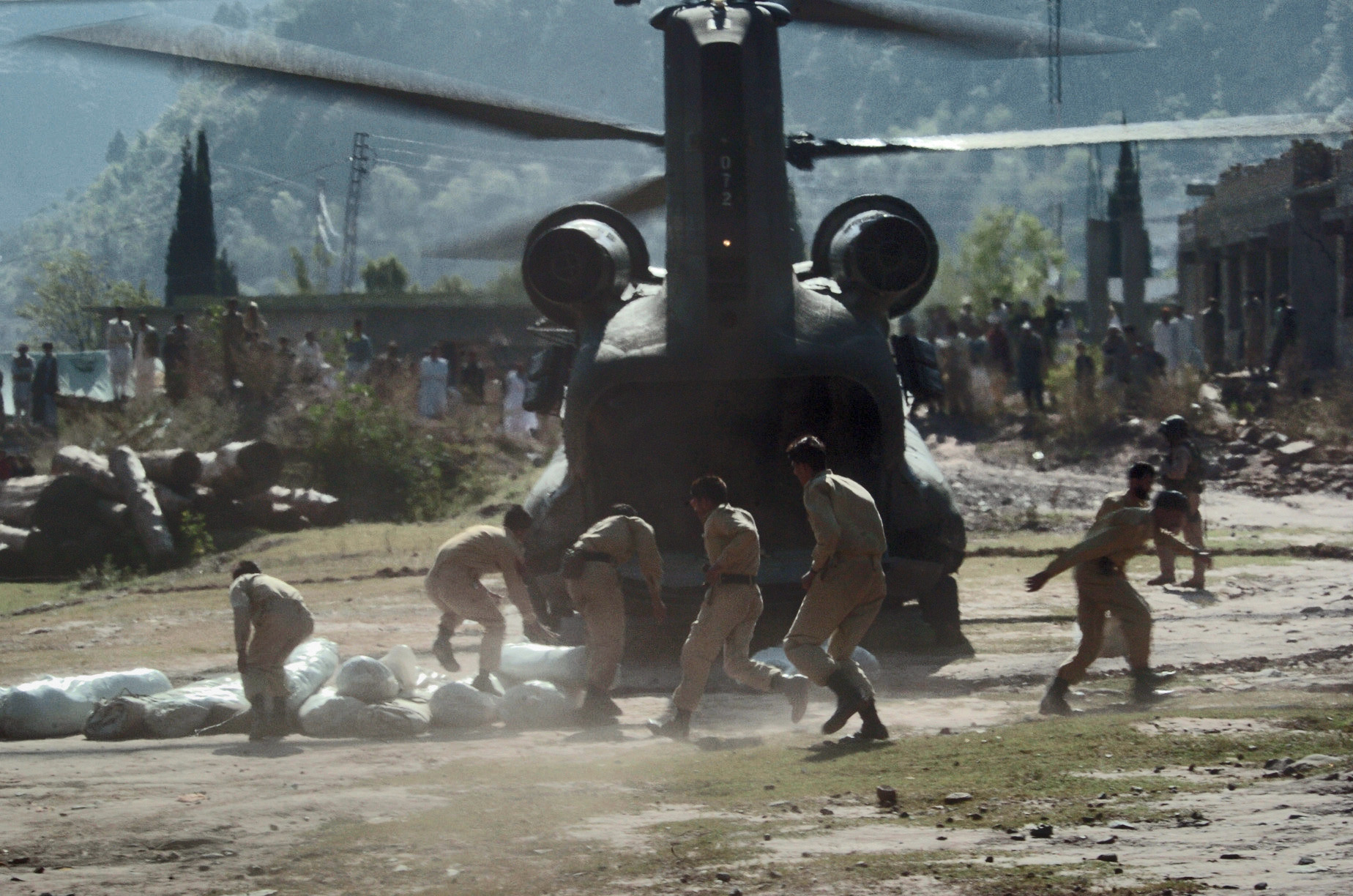
The Pakistan Army soldiers distributing the military rations to the affectees of the national calamities. The Army often involves in the civil society to relief activities and national-building to the local population of affected areas.

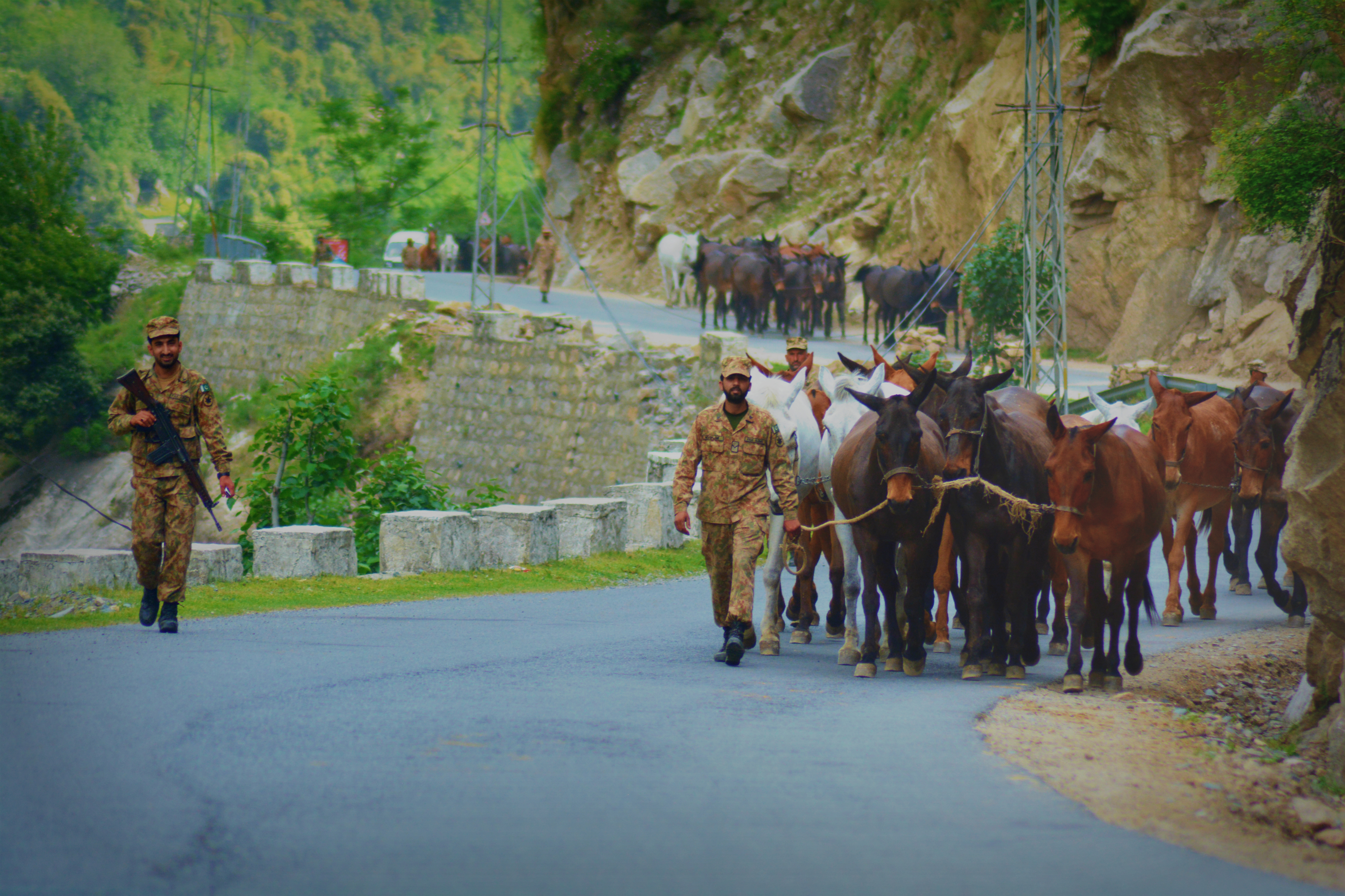
The RVF Corps moving animals and livestock to a safer location after the flood warning issues by the NDMA in 2017

The Pakistan Army has played an integral part in the civil society of Pakistan, almost since its inception. In 1996, General Jehangir Karamat described Pakistan armed forces' relations with the society:

In my opinion, if we have to repeat of past events then we must understand that Military leaders can pressure only up to a point. Beyond that their own position starts getting undermined because the military is after all is a mirror image of the civil society from which it is drawn.

— General Jehangir Karamat on civil society–military relations

In times of national calamities and natural disasters, including the devastating earthquake in 2005 or the great floods in 2010, the army engineering corps, medical, logistical personnel, and other armed forces services have played a major role in area rehabilitation and reconstruction of cities and towns while distributing the relief goods and military rations to the affected civilians. Since 1948, the army has been involved in providing power generation to affected areas, building dams, and construction of towns and cities, and conducting rescue operations for evacuations of general public and animals from endangerment.

To coordinate and manage the proper relief operations, reconstructions, and rehabilitation, the federal government appoints the active-duty officers, as an external billets appointments, to lead federal agencies such as the NDMA. Besides relief activities in the country, the Pakistan Army has also engaged in other parts of the world such as coordinating and leading the relief efforts in Indonesia, Bangladesh, and Sri Lanka after these countries were affected by the underwater earthquake that resulted in tsunami in 2004.

Stephen P. Cohen in his article, Pakistan: Army, Society and Security writes:

There are armies which guard their nation's borders, there are armies which are concerned with protecting their own position in society, and there are armies which defend a cause or an idea. The Pakistan Army does all three.

— Stephen P. Cohen

== Corporate and business activities ==
The Pakistan Army's business interests, managed through foundations like the Fauji Foundation, have been a subject of international scrutiny. News agencies and investigations by financial regulators allege the military controls a vast network of business enterprises and conglomerates, with estimates suggesting a total revenue of US$20 billion in 2007–2008. The Defence Housing Authority (DHA) and Askari Real Estate are prominent examples of the Pakistan Army's large-scale real estate ventures. However, critics point out that none of the 46 housing schemes directly built by the armed forces cater to ordinary soldiers, civilian officers or other army personnel.

The Fauji Foundation (lit. 'Soldier Foundation') is a Pakistani conglomerate publicly traded on the Pakistan Stock Exchange (PSX). It manufactures and sells processed meat, and operates stud and dairy farms primarily for the military's use. The foundation also has subsidiaries that contribute to the civilian economy through various enterprises, including bakeries, security services and banking. Its factories produce a wide range of goods, including sugar and fertilizer.

== Awards and honours ==
=== Wartime Gallantry Awards ===
Nishan-e-Haider (Order of the Lion)
Hilal-e-Jurat (Crescent of Courage)
Sitara-e-Jurat (Star of Courage)
Tamgha-e-Jurat (Medal of Courage)
Imtiazi Sanad (Mentioned in Despatches)

Order of Wear
Nishan-e-Haider (Order of the Lion)	Nishan-e-Imtiaz (Civilian)	Nishan-e-Imtiaz (Military)	Hilal-e-Jurat (Crescent of Courage)
Hilal-e-Shujaat (Crescent of Bravery)	Hilal-e-Imtiaz (Civilian)	Hilal-e-Imtiaz (Military)	Sitara-e-Jurat (Star of Courage)
Sitara-e-Shujaat (Star of Bravery)	Sitara-e-Imtiaz (Military)	President's Award for Pride of Performance	Sitara-e-Basalat (Star of Good Conduct)
Sitara-e-Eisaar (Star of Sacrifice)	Tamgha-e-Jurat (Medal of Courage)	Tamgha-e-Shujaat (Medal of Bravery)	Tamgha-e-Imtiaz (Military)
Tamgha-e-Basalat (Medal of Good Conduct)	Tamgha-e-Eisaar (Medal of Sacrifice)	Imtiazi Sanad (Mentioned in Despatches)	Tamgha-e-Diffa (General Service Medal)
Sitara-e-Harb 1965 War (War Star 1965)	Sitara-e-Harb 1971 War (War Star 1971)	Tamgha-e-Jang 1965 War (War Medal 1965)	Tamgha-e-Jang 1971 War (War Medal 1971)
Tamgha-e-Baqa (Nuclear Test Medal)	Tamgha-e-Istaqlal Pakistan (Escalation with India Medal)	Tamgha-e-Azm (Medal of Conviction)	Tamgha-e-Khidmat (Class-I) (Medal of Service Class I)
Tamgha-e-Khidmat (Class-II) (Medal of Service Class I)	Tamgha-e-Khidmat (Class-III) (Medal of Service Class I)	10 Years Service Medal	20 Years Service Medal
30 Years Service Medal	35 Years Service Medal	40 Years Service Medal	Pakistan Tamgha (Pakistan Medal)
Tamgha-e-Sad Saala Jashan-e- Wiladat-e-Quaid-e-Azam	Tamgha-e-Jamhuria (Republic Commemoration Medal)	Hijri Tamgha (Hijri Medal)	Jamhuriat Tamgha (Democracy Medal)
Qarardad-e-Pakistan Tamgha (Resolution Day Golden Jubilee Medal)	Tamgha-e-Salgirah Pakistan (Independence Day Golden Jubilee Medal)	Command & Staff College Quetta Instructor's Medal	Command & Staff College Quetta Student Medal

=== Nishan-e-Haider ===
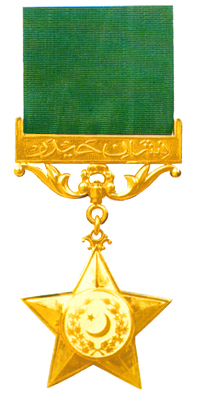
Nishan-e-Haider
(lit. 'Order of Lion')
Nine out of ten Army personnel have been posthumously honoured

In military awards hierarchy, the Nishan-e-Haidar (lit. 'Order of Lion Urdu نشان حیدر') is the highest and most prestigious honour awarded posthumously for bravery and actions of valor in event of war. The honour is a namesake of Ali and the recipients receiving this honorary title as a sign of respect: Shaheed meaning martyr.

Since 1947–2019, there has been ten Pakistani military officers and personnel who have honoured with this prestigious medal— out of which, nine have been officers and soldiers in the Pakistan Army, bestowed to those who engaged in wars with India.

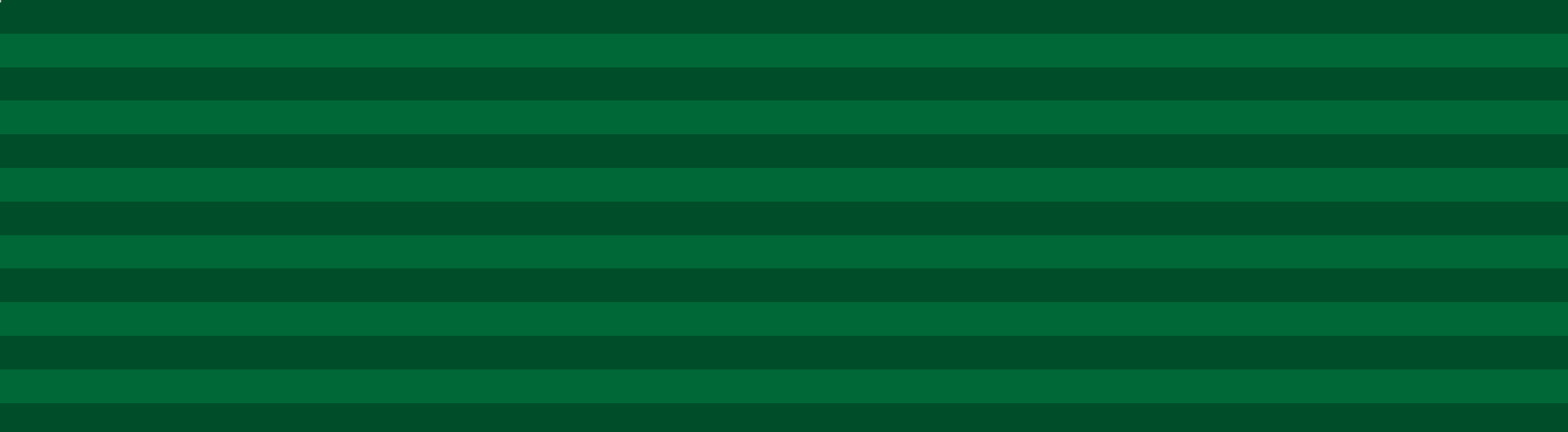
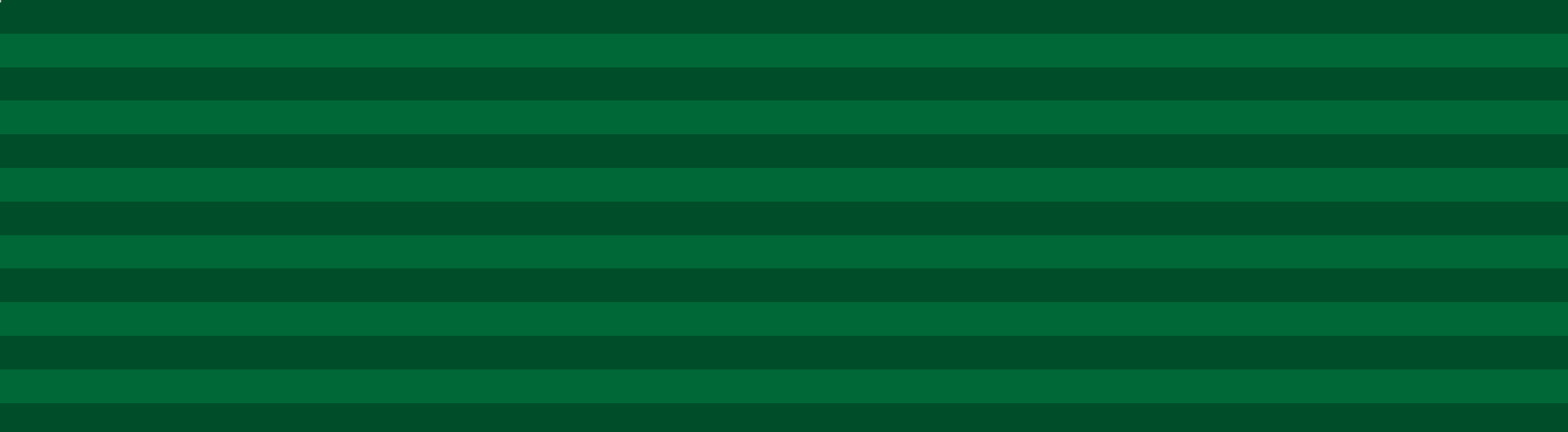
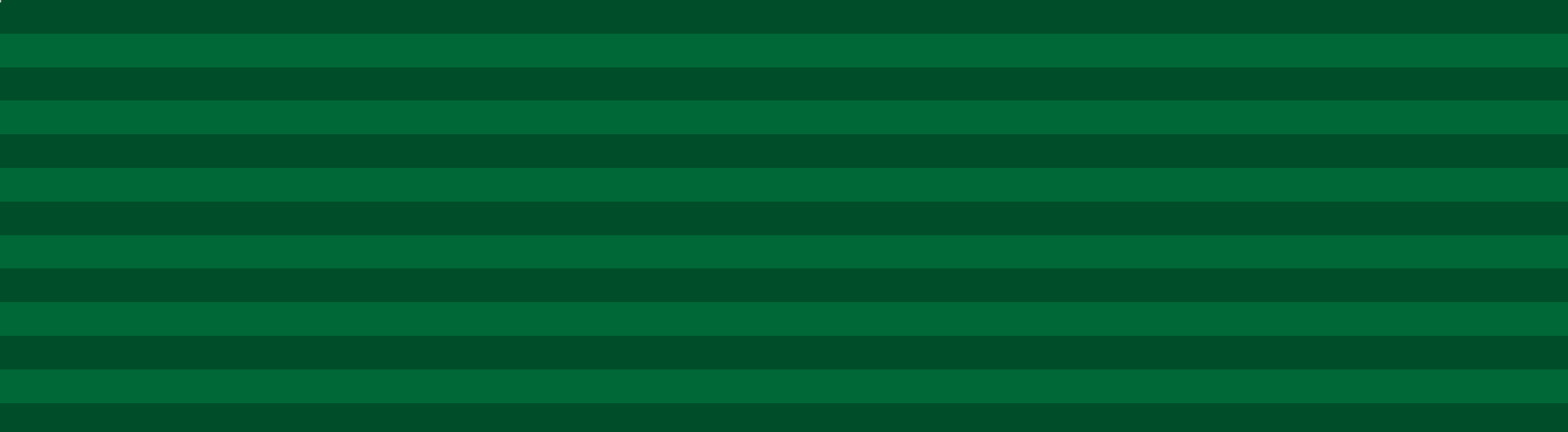
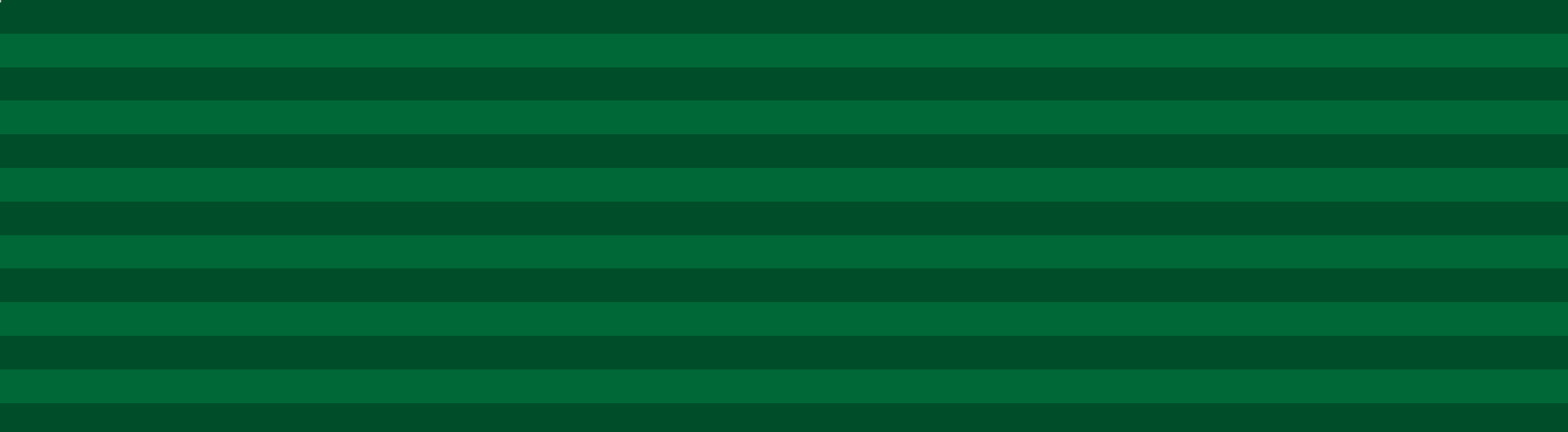
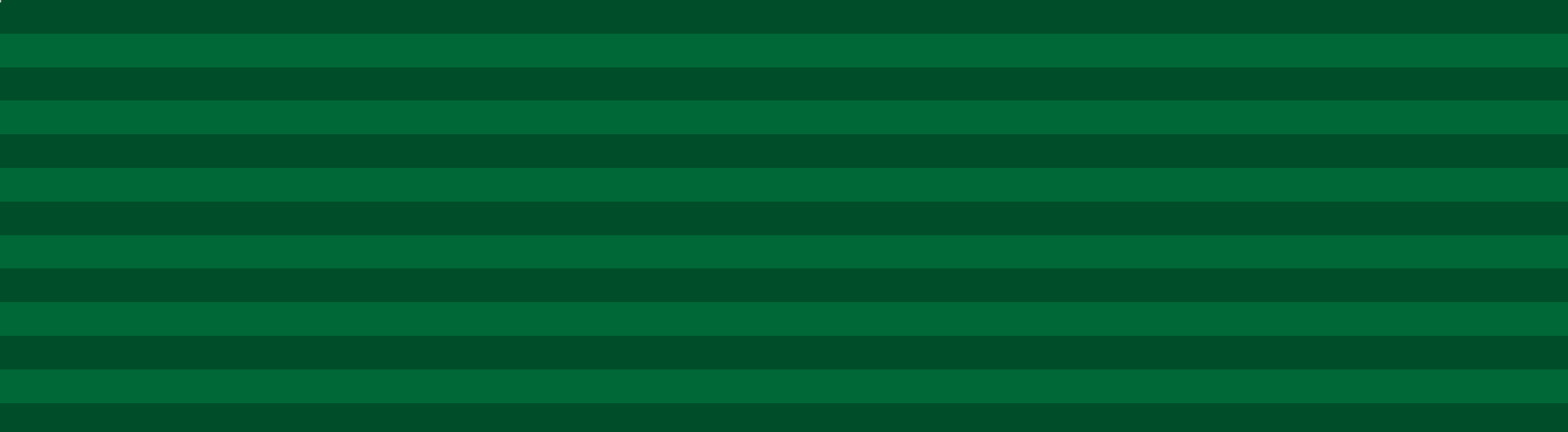
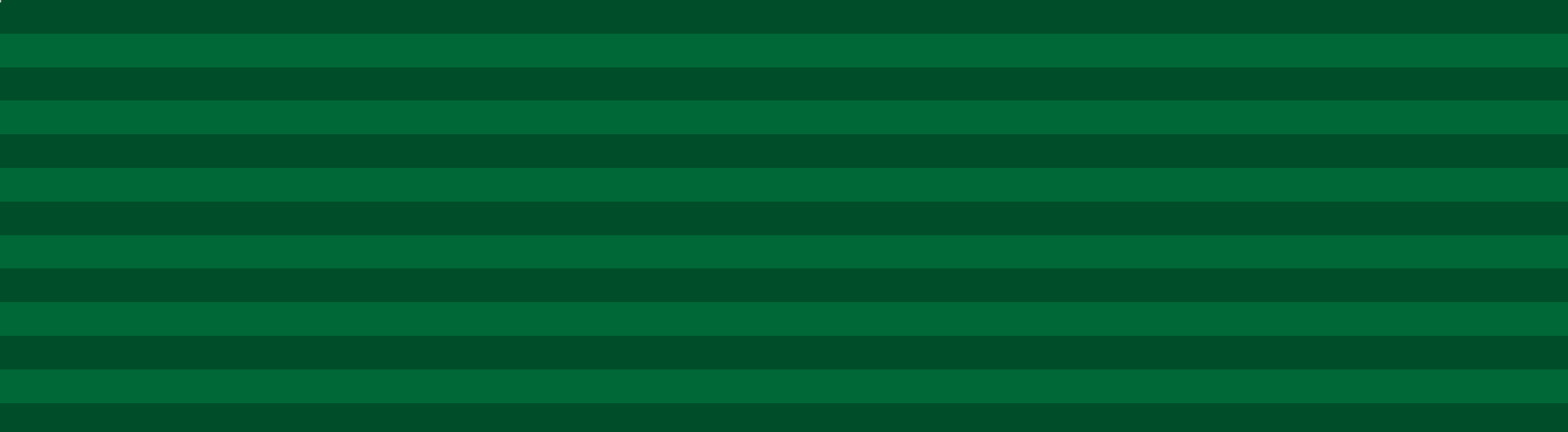
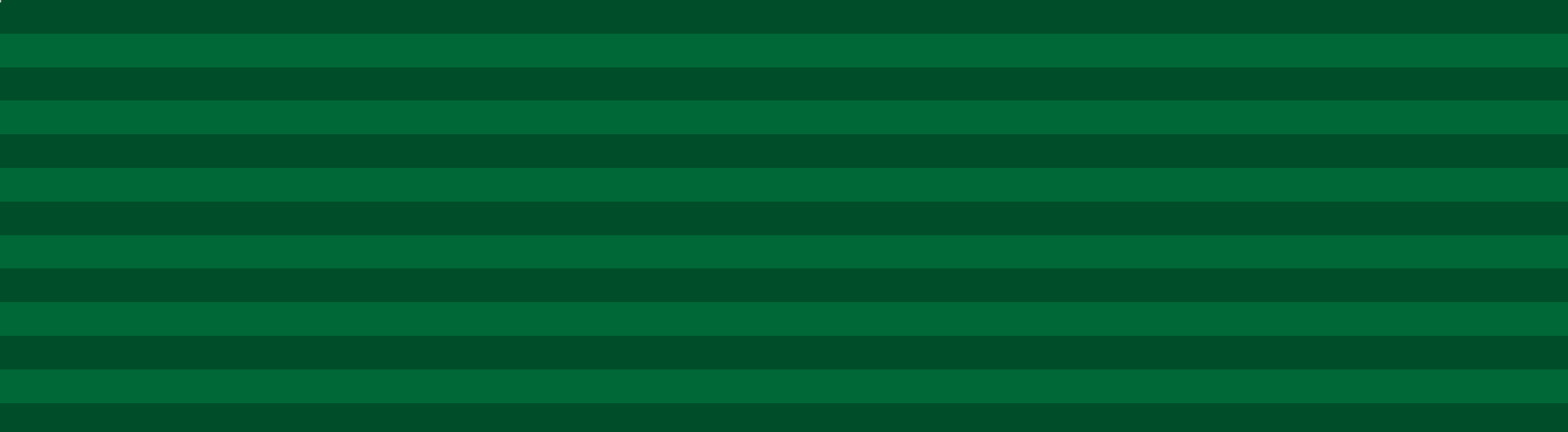
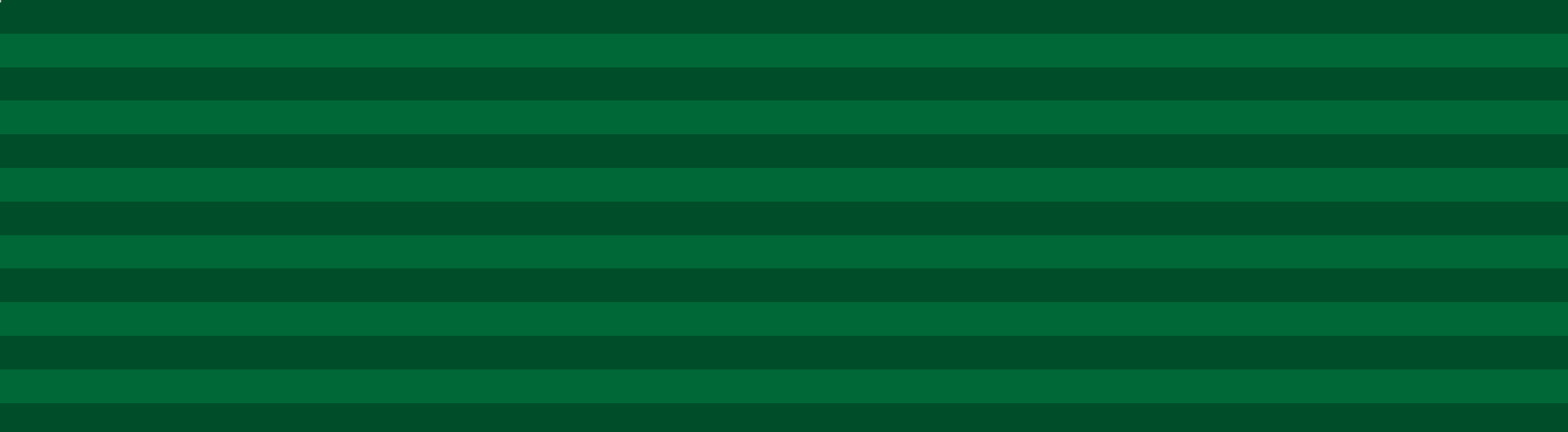
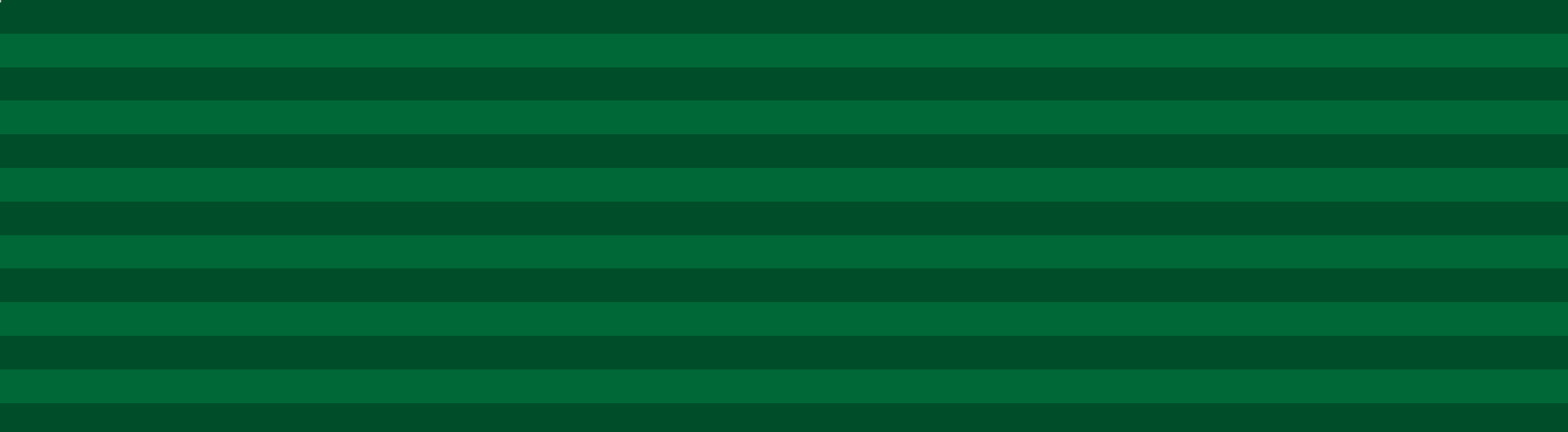
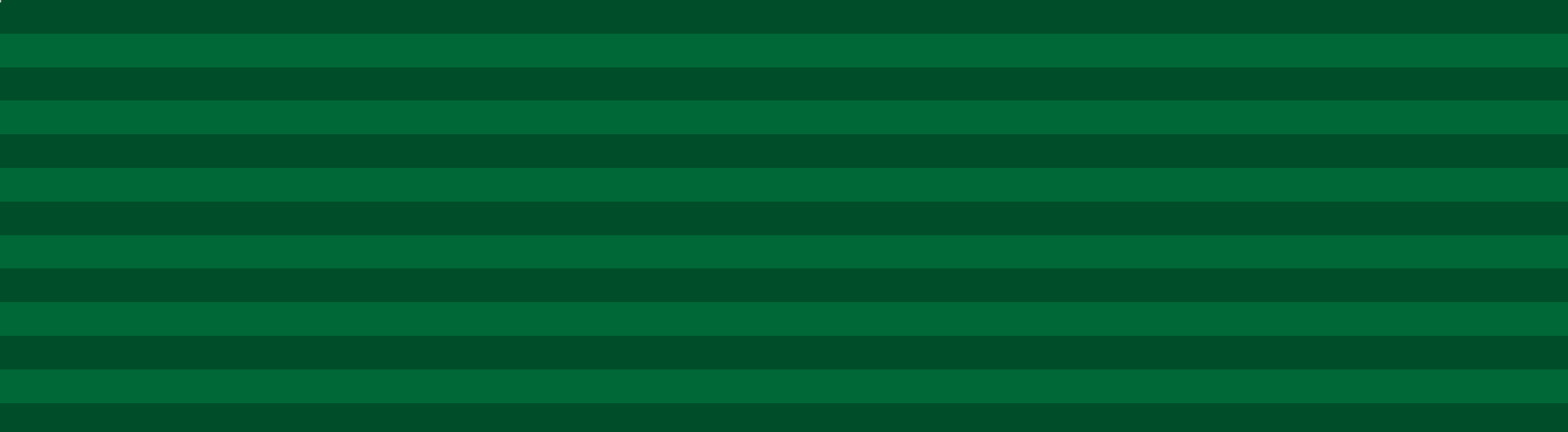
Order	Recipients	Rank	Regiment/Corps of the recipient	Year of conflict	War and Gallantry Ribbon
1	Raja Muhammad Sarwar	Captain	Punjab Regiment	India–Pakistan war of 1947–1948
2	Saif Ali Janjua	Naik (Corporal)	Azad Kashmir Regiment	India–Pakistan war of 1947–1948
3	Tufail Mohammad	Major	Punjab Regiment	1958 East Pakistan–India border skirmishes
4	Raja Aziz Bhatti	Major	Punjab Regiment	India–Pakistan war of 1965
5	Shabbir Sharif	Major	Frontier Force Regiment	India–Pakistan war of 1965
6	Muhammad Hussain Janjua	Sepoy (Pvt.)	Armoured Corps	India–Pakistan war of 1971
7	Muhammad Akram	Major	Frontier Force Regiment	India–Pakistan war of 1971
8	Muhammad Mahfuz	Lance Naik (Lance Corporal)	Punjab Regiment	India–Pakistan war of 1971
9	Karnal Sher	Captain	Sindh Regiment	Kargil War
10	Lalak Jan	Havildar (Sgt.)	Northern Light Infantry Regiment	Kargil War

=== Recipient of the foreign awards ===
The Pakistan Army has received foreign awards for its services to other nations. Notably, two army pilots from the Aviation Corps were honored for a daring rescue operation. Lt-Col. Rashiduhlla Beg and Lt-Col. Khalid Amir were awarded the Golden Order for Services by the Slovenian President in the capital, Ljubljana, for rescuing Slovenian mountaineer Tomaz Humar, who was stranded on the 8,125-meter (26,657 ft) peak Nanga Parbat.

In addition, there are numbers of the army general officers have been honoured multiple times with the United States's Legion of Merit for cooperation and strengthening bilateral ties with the United States 1980s–2015. In 2010, the Pakistan Army was awarded with a gold medal at the Exercise Cambrian Patrol held in Wales in the United Kingdom.

== Sports ==
The Army offers programs in many sports including boxing, field hockey, cricket, swimming, table tennis, karate, basketball, soccer, and other sports.

The Army basketball program regularly provides the Pakistan national basketball team with players.

== See also ==
- National Guard (Pakistan)
- Civil Armed Forces
- Comparative military ranks
- Islamic Military Counter Terrorism Coalition
- List of serving generals of the Pakistan Army
- Military history of Pakistan
- Pakistan Army Retribution (video game)
- Pakistan Military Academy
- Special Service Group (SSG)
- Structure of the Pakistan Army
- Army Rocket Force Command
