= Azad Kashmir Regiment =

Infantry Regiment of the Pakistan Army

- Regiment logo
- Active: 1947-Present
- Country: Pakistan
- Branch: Pakistan Army
- Role: Infantry regiment with Heavy Anti-tank and Light commando battalions
- Size: 49 battalions
- Regimental centre: Mansar
- Motto: 'وَ جٰهَدُوْا فِیْ سَبِیْلِ اللّٰهِ Translation: 'And strive in the way of Allah'
- Facing Colours: Green & Red
- Mascot: Chinar Leaf
- Equipment: APC M113A, TOW, TOW-II, Milan, BSWS
- Engagements: Indo-Pakistani War of 1947; Indo-Pak War 1965; Indo-Pak War 1971; Siachen conflict Indo-Pak War 1999; War in Afghanistan (2001–2021); War in North-West Pakistan; Unified Task Force; United Nation Military missions Balochistan Conflict
- Battle honours: Jammu 1948 - Kashmir 1948 - 1965 Indo Pak War - Operation Gibraltar - Operation Grand Slam - 1971 Indo Pak War - Operation Koh Paima - 1999 Kargil War

Commanders
- Colonel-in-Chief: General Abdul Waheed Kakar NI(M) SBt COAS
- Colonel Commandant: Lieutenant General Shahid Imtiaz HI(M)
- Notable commanders: Lt. Gen. Haroon Aslam; Lt. Gen. Ishfaq Nadeem Ahmad; Lt. Gen. Ikram ul Haq; Lt. Gen. Hidayat ur Rehman; Lt. Gen. Sher Afgun; Lt. Gen. Javed Hassan, HI (M); Lt. Gen. F. S. Lodhi; Lt. Gen. Zia Ullah Khan HI (M); Lt. Gen. Sarfraz Ali, HI(M) TBt & Bar

Insignia
- Identification symbol: The Chinar Leaf and Crescent

The Azad Kashmir Regiment (AK Regt) is one of the six infantry regiments in the Pakistan Army named after Azad Kashmir (Pakistan Administered Kashmir). It holds the distinction of being the only Battle Born Regiment in South Asia, formed by locals of Azad Kashmir to fight against Dogra Raj, and the first regiment raised after Pakistan's independence. With the Regimental Centre at Mansar Camp in Attock District, the Regiment has participated in all operations and wars fought by the Pakistan Army.

== Historical background ==
The Azad Kashmir Regiment was established in 1974 from the original Kashmir Liberation Forces that rose in 1947 in rebellion against the Maharaja of Jammu and Kashmir in present-day Azad Kashmir. They were regularised at the end of the First Kashmir War and made a part of the Pakistan Army under the name Azad Kashmir Regular Force (AKRF). The force has the distinction of not having been raised by any government order, but "raised itself" when bands of armed World War II veterans along with locals (including women such as Mujahida Hussain Bibi), organized themselves into disciplined ad hoc platoons, companies and battalions led by retired officers, JCOs and NCOs, and went out to fight in Kashmir against the Indian Army in 1948. The AKRF had its own intake and training structure separate from the Pakistan Army. Uniforms and rank structures were the same as in the Pakistan Army. At that time, all the battalions of the AKRF were part of the 12th Infantry Division of the Pakistan Army, permanently stationed in Azad Kashmir. Although upon requirement, two AKRF regiments (12th and 21st) were sent to East Pakistan as part of reinforcements to Eastern Command. Originally created as a militia, the AKRF functioned as a paramilitary force.

The AKRF was amalgamated to the Pakistan Army as Regular Infantry Regiment in 1974 as Azad Kashmir Regiment.

== Commandants of the Regiment ==
Col Commandants of the Regt include:

1. Maj Gen M. Sherin Khan (May 69 to May 74)
2. Lt Gen Muhammad Akbar Khan (April 1975 to Oct 1976)
3. Lt Gen Faiz Ali Chishti HI(M) SB.t (Oct 1976 to Oct 1980)
4. Lt Gen Sardar Farooq Shaukat Khan Lodhi HI(M) SB.t (Jan 1981 to Jan 1985)
5. Lt Gen Zahid Ali Akbar Khan HI(M) SB.t (Jan 1985 to Aug 1989)
6. Lt Gen Ziaullah Khan HI(M) ( Nov 1993 to Nov 1997)
7. Maj Gen Muhammad Saleem Arshad HI(M) TB.t (Nov 1997 to Nov 1998)
8. Maj Gen Muhammad Anwar Khan HI(M) (Nov 1999 to Jul 2001)
9. Lt Gen Javed Hassan HI(M) (March 2002 to Oct 2004)
10. Maj Gen Mukhtar Ahmed HI(M) (March 2005 to March 2009)
11. Lt Gen Haroon Aslam HI(M) SB.t (March 2009 to Oct 2013)
12. Lt Gen Ishfaq Nadeem Ahmad HI(M) (Oct 2013 to March 2017)
13. Lt Gen Hidayat ur Rehman HI(M) (March 2017 to Apr 2019)
14. Lt Gen Sher Afgun HI(M) (Apr 2019 to Dec 2021)
15. Lt Gen Sarfaraz Ali HI(M) TB.t & Bar (Dec 2021 to Aug 2022)
16. Lt Gen Shahid Imtiaz HI(M) (16 March 2023-till date)

== War history ==
=== Kashmir 1947–48 ===
What began as a revolt by young rebels and ex servicemen turned out to be a big setback for tripartite alliance of Maharaja of Jammu and Kashmir, Indian Government and remnants of outgoing British colonial authorities still in control of India and partial control of Pakistan. To quote the words of Pakistan Army's Official Portal "They liberated over 34,000 square miles of the State's territory that is now called Azad Jammu and Kashmir and Northern Areas." AKRF began its struggle as Armed Militia known as Lashkar, Ghazis and Jathas. As the volunteers swelled the ranks and files, a command structure was established to control these para military force of vigilante. Being well aware of aspirations of the people of State, Pakistani Government under the leadership of Governor General M A Jinnah and Prime Minister Liaquat Ali Khan decided to support the Lashkars. British C in C of its Army, General Frank Messervy refused to obey the instructions of M A Jinnah. However, AKRF took Muzaffarabad by 13 October 1947, Mirpur by 25 November 1947 and Jhangar in December 1947. India meanwhile managed to get the Instrument of accession signed by the Hindu Maharaja of state and landed its Military forces in the valley using massive air lifts. Fierce fighting continued for over a year but AKRF with the assistance of Pakistani tribals and regular army managed to capture Districts of Mirpur, Bhimber, Kotli, Bagh, Rawlakot, Muzaffarabad and Neelum. A total of 2633 all ranks of the regiment died during the war. Naik Saif Ali Janjua of 5th & 18th Battalion of AK Regt (Haider Dil) & (Al Saif) was awarded Hilal-e-Kashmir at Mendhar sector of Jammu. He was commanding a platoon at Pir Kalewa feature and died on 25 Oct 1948 during the battle of Pir Kalewa which was attacked by 5 Infantry Brigade of Indian Army.

=== Indo-Pakistani War of 1965 ===
373 personnel from the AK Regiment embraced martyrdom in the war including 2 Officers and 17 JCOs. 268 personnel were awarded Gallantry Awards including 31 Sitara-e-Jurat and 37 Tamgha-i-Jurat

==== Operation Gibraltar ====
With erstwhile AKRF being part of 12th Inf Division, AKRF Units were heavily involved in raising, training and providing manpower for Gibraltar Forces.

==== Ghaznavi Force ====
Out of all Gibraltar Forces, Ghaznavi Force led by Major Munawar Khan (21st AKRF) was the most successful one and enjoyed decisive domination over Indian forces. The Force following a successful infiltration, operated in Mendhar - Rajouri areas. It raided several Military targets including HQ 25 Div and police stations in Rajouri, Thana Mandi, Behramgala, Budhal and Ramban According to History of Kumaon Regiment, "its (Ghaznavi Force) depridation caused the maximum worry to our security forces" After a failed attempt to destroy Ramban bridge, the force trapped and engaged a force of 7 Madras and inflicted heavy casualties forcing it to withdraw After this, Maj Munawwar effectively gained control of around 500 Square Miles of territory in Budhil-Rajauri and practically worked as a de facto Civil Administrator. Ghaznavi Force then trained local volunteers who participated in guerilla Operations against the Indian Army. On 27th Sept, after insistence by the HQ 12 Div Pakistan, Ghaznavi Force exfiltrated with a heavy heart back to their base in Azad Kashmir Maj Munawwar was later awarded Sitara-e-Jurat and given the title of 'King of Rajouri' by Field Martial Ayub Khan. The infiltration route of Ghaznavi Force is still known as Munawar Pass today.

==== Nusrat Force ====
Nusrat Force was tasked with supporting other Gibraltar Forces and to ensure fixation of Indian Forces along the Cease-Fire Line. This Force consisted of 14 groups, out of these, AKRF provided C/D Group (16 AKRF), E Group (9 AKRF,13 AKRF, 1 AK Sp Coy), F Group (6 AKRF), G Group (7 AKRF), H Group, NUSRAT 4 (4 AKRF), J Group ( 11 AKRF, 12 AKRF, 21 AKRF), K Group (1 AKRF, 21 AKRF), L Group, M Group ( 5 AKRF), N Group (19 AKRF)

==== Operation Grandslam ====
Two AKRF Infantry Units, 5th AKRF (Haider Dil) and 19th AKRF (Mazboot Dil), and supporting elements of 81 AK Fd bty, 4 AK Sp Coy, 5 AK A/Tk Coy and 57 AK Fd Coy Engrs were provided to Maj Gen Akhtar Malik for Operation Grand Slam.

5 AKRF and 19 AKRF were part of 4 Sector. 5 AKRF provided firmbase along CFL Line in Padhar to facilitate Phase 1 of the Operation and through skilled fighting captured Lalleal and cleared initially bypassed Indian positions of Pir Jamal, Dalla, Paur, Maira and Moel, while 19 AKRF which was on point for 4 Sector in a gallant attack with armour support (due to be provided by 11 Cav) arriving late, captured Patrara and Dewa, being held by the 3 Mahar Regiment and 8 Jammu and Kashmir Militia. Writes Yousaf Saraf, "5 AK and 19 AK did a really wonderful job. 5th AK contained enemy positions at Dalla, Paur, Pir Jamal and Mehra while 19th AK inflicted a crushing defeat on the well fortified Indian position Patrara which was captured"

In the final stages of the Operation, A coy 5 AKRF captured Pt 1886, while 19th AKRF captured Malla Ridge, diary of CO 2 Grenadiers containing useful intel was taken in possession.

=== Indo-Pak War of 1971 ===
==== Eastern Sector ====
Two AKRF Units, 12 AKRF (Maidan Battalion), 21 AKRF (Koh e Paima) and one Company from 14 AKRF (Lashkri) were deployed to East Pakistan. Upon their arrival, these were split in companies, The Company of 14 AKRF, two companies of 12 AKRF under 27 Ind Brigade (14 Div) under Brig Saadullah Khan HJ. Two Companies 21 AKRF were under 117 Brigade, one company under 53 Brigade (both in 39 Ad-Hoc Div).

==== Poonch Operation ====
Despite severe limitations due to a lack of reserves and a tough defensive role, Maj Gen Akbar, GOC 12th Infantry Division made an ambitious plan to capture the town of Poonch. The greater Poonch area was already under Azad Kashmir, liberated by AKRF in the First Kashmir War.

Maj Gen Akbar assigned two infantry Brigades to capture Poonch. Seven battalions from the AKRF took part in this operation and gallantly faced regular Indian army units that were superior in numbers, weapons, equipment, and training. Ultimately the Operation did not meet success due to numerical inferiority, lack of reserves, and poor planning by the Divisional leadership. The troops of AKRF upheld the Regimental traditions and fought with bravery, with 83 personnel embracing martyrdom including the Commanding Officer of 19 AKRF. The 28 AKRF met the same fate after the injury of their company commander Major Muhammad Latif was later given the gallantry award of Tamgha-i-Basalat who lost his left eye in an encounter near Poonch city, during this encounter the two companies 28 AKRF lost more than a dozen soldiers. The Regiment further proved its mettle in the 1972 Leepa Valley Operation.

=== Leepa Valley Operation 1972 ===
The Azad Kashmir Regular Forces fought in the 1971 war and then in 1972 when the 9th Azad Kashmir Battalion defended Chakpatra and Leepa Valley against a larger Indian force composed of several regular battalions. This particular battalion was first led in 1948 by Lt Colonel Ghulam Rasul Raja-Sitara-e-Jurrat (1948), Military Cross (WWII). During the Battle of Leepa Valley, the 9th AK Battalion with 25 Mountain Regiment Artillery distinguished itself under the leadership of Lt Colonel Haq Nawaz Kyani, SJ and Bar, who died leading the battalion from the front. The Company Commander of B Coy called for artillery fire upon their position while being overrun by the enemy; in doing this they repulsed the enemy attack. The Pakistan Army later honored the AKRF by absorbing it into its ranks and giving it the status of a Regular Line Infantry Regiment. The AKRF thus became the Azad Kashmir Regiment on 20 September 1972.

=== Operations along LOC ===
The regiment has involved in all Indo-Pakistani War and has always deployed on the LOC. Notable operations by the Regiment in LOC environment include Battle of Pir Kalewa, Battle of Paran Hills, Siege of Poonch, Battle of Mirpur, Battle of Kotli, Battle of Mendhar, Battle of Muzaffarabad, Operation Grand Slam, Operation Gibraltar, Leepa Valley Operation, Chumik operation, Siachen operations, Operation Koh Paima and countless other major and minor operations. In recognition of bold and brilliant performance of Regiment, it was changed from an irregular to regular Infantry regiment on 20 September 1971.

=== War on Terror ===
The AK Regiment has performed distinctively during Pakistan's War on Terror as well as Counter Insurgency Operations in Baluchistan. 35 AK Regt, fought one of the toughest battles of the war on terror, Operation Brekhna, the mission to capture Walidad feature in Mohmand Agency. 6 AK Regiment fought in Swat under the leadership of Lt Gen Sarfaraz Ali Shaheed TB.t & Bar (then Lt Col).

== International assignments ==
Regiment's experience transcends the borders of motherland. Its battalions have served on at least four continents as part of international peace keepers under the UN mandate or training battalions for friendly countries. The International duties include Bosnia, Haiti, DRC (Congo), Liberia, Côte d'Ivoire, Burundi, Sudan and Bahrain. The experience of its all ranks employed on independent duties surpasses the list and includes all continents of world.

== Casualties and gallantry awards ==
In recognition of its service, the Azad Kashmir Regiment have been bestowed with a full range of National and International gallantry awards. The Regiment's gallantry awards includes a "Nishan E Haider" awarded to Naik Saif Ali Janjua of 18th Azad Kashmir Regiment in 1948. This award is equivalent of Britain's Victoria Cross and the United States' Medal of Honor

== Peacetime performance ==
When not engaged in operations of war, the Regiment continues to train. Its battalions have a habit of displaying highest standards of training, sportsmanship and military professionalism. 8th Battalion of the Azad Kashmir Regiment won gold medals and secured 1st position in Exercise Cambrian Patrol, considered to be the toughest military training competition of the world.

Erstwhile AKRF also conducted relief and construction operations making and maintaining several road links in rough terrain of Azad Kashmir.

The Regiment has a Bagpipe band, considered to be the best of Pakistan Army. The band has represented Pak Army internationally, a number of times

== Units ==
Unit	Raised as	Raised at	Title	Battle Honours
1 AK	1st Azad Kashmir Sudhnuti Battalion	Palandri	The Hill Panthers	KASHMIR 1948
2 AK	2nd Muzzaffarabad Battalion	Chinari	313 Taimuri	KASHMIR 1948
3 AK	10th Azad Kashmir Sudhnuti Battalion	Tatrinote	Hussainia	KASHMIR 1948
4 AK	8th Azad Kashmir Sudhnuti Battalion	Palandri	Fighting Four	KASHMIR 1948 HAJIPIR 1965
5 AK	5th Azad Kashmir Sudhnuti Battalion	Mong	Haider Dil	KASHMIR 1948 DEWA-CHAMB 1965
6 AK	6th Azad Kashmir Sudhnuti Battalion	Rawalakot	Ghazi	KASHMIR 1948 HAJIPIR 1965
7 AK	7th Bhimber Battalion	Mirpur	Striking Seven	KASHMIR 1948 HAJIPIR1965
8 AK	8th Azad Kashmir Battalion	Muzaffarabad	Pasban	
9 AK	9th Azad Kashmir Sudhnuti Battalion	Trarkhal	Leepa Heroes	
10 AK	10th Kotli Battalion	Throchi	Zinda Dil	KASHMIR 1948 HAJIPIR 1965
11 AK	11th Mirpur Battalion	Chak Jamal	Shaheen	KASHMIR 1948
12 AK	12th Azad Kashmir Sudhnuti Battalion	Kakuta	Maidan	KASHMIR 1948 MAHL 1965
13 AK	13th Siot Battalion	Siot	Zinda Dil	
14 AK	14th Rajauri Battalion	Rajpur Kamila	Lashkri	KASHMIR 1948 DEWA-CHAMB 1965
15 AK	15th Jammu Battalion	Sialkot	Fakhr-e-Kashmir	
16 AK	2nd Azad Kashmir Sudhnuti Battalion	Palandri	An-Nasri	
17 AK	1st Hyderi Battalion	Surankot	First Hyderi	KASHMIR 1948
18 AK	2nd Hyderi Battalion	Mendhar	Al Saif	KASHMIR 1948
19 AK(MIB)	3rd Hyderi Battalion	Sehnsa	Mazboot Dil	KASHMIR 1948 DEWA-CHAMB 1965 JAURIAN 1965
20 AK	1st Farooqi Battalion	Potha	First Farooqi	
21 AK	2nd Farooqi Battalion	Kahuta	Koh-e-Paima	
22 AK	Budhal Battalion	Budhal	Zarb-e-Haider	
23 AK	Badar Battalion	Trarkhal	Taiz-o-Tund	TITHWAL-JURA 1965
24 AK	Khan Battalion	Samahni	Purzor Battalion	
25 AK	Panjal Battalion	Thannamang	Panjal Battalion	
26 AK	1st Mirpur (Pioneer) Battalion	Mirpur	Janbaz Awal	
27 AK	2nd Bagh (Pioneer) Battalion	Harighel	Muhafiz-e-Kazinag	
28 AK	3rd Muzzafarabad (Pioneer) Battalion	Deolian	Janbaz	
29 AK	1st Bagh Battalion	Neelabutt	Sher-e-Chamba	KASHMIR 1948
30 AK	2nd Bagh Battalion	Neelabutt		KASHMIR 1948
31 AK	3rd Bagh Battalion	Harighel	Shahzor	KASHMIR 1948
32 AK	4th Bagh Battalion	Harighel	Bahadur	KASHMIR 1948
33 AK	5th Bagh Battalion	Harighel	Shan	KASHMIR 1948
34 AK	New Jhelum Battalion	Chak Jamal	Jungju	
35 AK	Poonch Holding Battalion	Trarkhal	Paikar-e-Jurrat	
36 AK(HAT)	4th Azad Kashmir Sudhnuti Battalion	Kotli		KASHMIR 1948
37 AK(HAT)	5th Hyderi Battalion	Mendhar	Baktar Shikan	
38 AK(HAT)	6th Bagh Battalion	Harighel	Taimuri	KASHMIR 1948
39 AK(HAT)	New Reasi Battalion	Khuiratta	Tank Busters	
40 AK(HAT)	4th Poonch (Pioneer) Battalion	Trarkhal	Tank Hunter	
41 AK(HAT)	41 AK	Mansar Camp	Tank Shikans	
42 AK(HAT(	42 AK	Mansar Camp	Shahan	
43 AK(HAT)	43 AK	Mansar Camp	Har Dum Taiz Tar	
44 AK(HAT)	44 AK	Mansar Camp	Ribat us sehra	
45 AK(HAT)	45 AK	Mansar Camp	Elite of the Desert	
47 AK	47 AK	Mansar Camp	Hawk Talons	
48 AK	48 AK	Mansar Camp		
49 AK	49 AK	Mansar Camp		
50 AK	50 AK	Mansar Camp		
227 AK HAT Coy		Chunian	Flight to Strike	
228 AK HAT Coy				
148 (SP) LAD AK			First to Fire-Chinaris	
4 LCB AK			Lazzaz	
10 LCB AK			Al Faqqar	

== See also ==
- Jammu and Kashmir Rifles
- Jammu and Kashmir Light Infantry
- Saif Ali Janjua
