= Tararkhal =

Tararkhal تراڑکھل
- Tehsil
- Location within Azad Kashmir Location within Pakistan
- Coordinates: 33.7621°N 73.7883°E
- Country: Pakistan,
- State: Azad Kashmir
- District: Sudhanoti
- Elevation: 1,982 m (6,502 ft)

Languages
  - Official: Urdu
- Time zone: PST
- Postal code: 12080

Tararkhal, also spelled Tarar Khal (Urdu: تراڑکھل), is a town in Sudhanoti District of Azad Kashmir. It is the headquarters of Tararkhal Tehsil. It is located 129 kilometers (80 mi) from Islamabad, 31 kilometers (19 mi) from Rawalakot and 32 kilometres (19.88 mi) from Pallandri at an altitude of 1,982 meters (6,502 ft).

A rest house of the Pakistan Public Works Department exists here for tourists to stay. All the basic necessities of life are available in town. Tararkhal has one hospital which is newly opened. It was officially opened on 16 September 2020 by the Sajjada Nasheen of Nerian Sharif, Sultan ul Arifeen Siddiqui Al-Azhari(son of Muhammad Alauddin Siddiqui Nerian Sharif). Other Hospitals include Zaman Hospital and THQ Hospital. Tomb of Maqbool Hussain (Sitara-e-Jurat) is also situated in a village Nari near MIU

Mohi-ud-Din Islamic University (MIU) is a private university in Nerian Sharif, Azad Kashmir, Pakistan, that offers undergraduate and post-graduate education. Army public school APS (Maqbool Hussain) is also a new addition in the city. Direction School system Opened its first branch in Nerian Shreef as Direction School system Al Furqan Campus near MIU.

== Famous Landmarks ==
Nearest famous places and landmarks include Mohiuddin Hospital, Mohi Uddin Islamic University Nerian Sharif and shrines of Ghulam Mohiudin Ghaznavi, Pir Durab (known as Pir Sani lasani) and Muhammad Alauddin Siddiqui, also known as Dabar-e-aalia Nerian Shareef. Tomb of (Maqbool Hussain). APS (Maqbool Hussain) campus.

It has various tourist attractions places in its surroundings like Grattapaar Waterfall, Diyaar, Kalaban, Nerian Shreef, lower Qillan, etc.
