= Tehreek-e-Nizam-e-Mustafa =

Barelvi organisation in Pakistan

Tehreek-e-Nizam-e-Mustafa تحریکِ نظامِ مصطفیٰ
- Founder: Muhammad Alauddin Siddiqui
- Ideology: Nizam e Mustafa
- Religion: Barelvi, Islam
- Regional affiliation: Azad Kashmir

Tehreek-e-Nizam-e-Mustafa (Urdu: تحریکِ نظامِ مصطفیٰ, lit. '"Movement of the system of the Prophet"') was a Barelvi organisation and religious movement based in Azad Kashmir. It was founded by Islamic scholar Muhammad Alauddin Siddiqui from Sadhanoti.

In late 1980's organization's founder attempt to implement Islam at the Government level by negotiating with politicians. The politicians of Kashmir Muhammad Abdul Qayyum Khan and Sikandar Hayat Khan were also the members of this movement. Many gatherings and meetings were held in Nerian Sharif. The politicians themselves came and the objectives of the movement were explained, then they announced the support.

The aim and the purpose of the movement is to implement Sharia (or "Nizam-e-Mustafa", meaning "the system of the Prophet Muhammad") in Pakistan and Azad Jammu and Kashmir.

In November 2014, the movement held a convention in Muzaffarabad.

The group held a convention in Kotli in December 2016.
