= Budhal =

Budhal may refer to:

- Budhal (tribe), an ethnic group of South Asia
- Budhal tehsil, a village and tehsil in Jammu and Kashmir, India
- Budhal Faqir (1865–1939), Sufi saint

== See also ==
- Badhal, a 1996 Maldivian film
