= Maqbool Hussain =

Pakistani Soldier / 1965 Indo-Pakistani War era POW

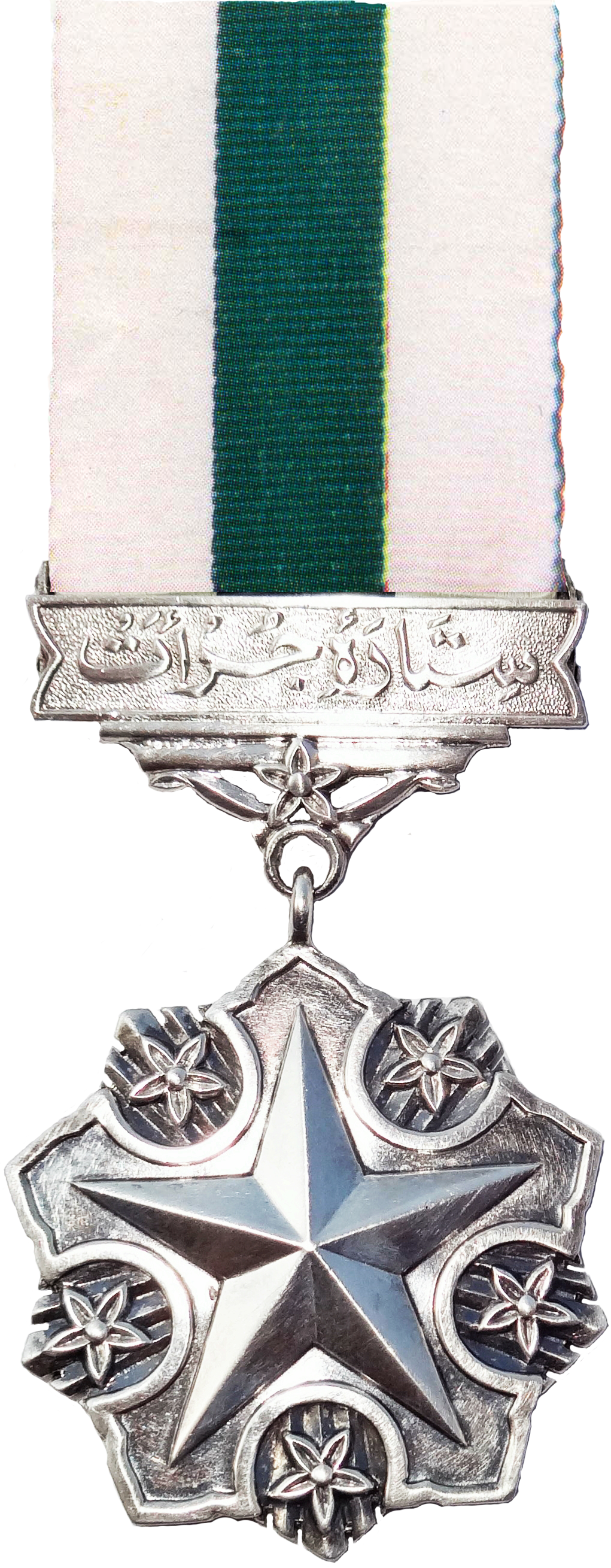
Sitara-e-Jurat Maqbool Hussain Ghazi
- مقبول حسین
- Maqbool Hussain in March 2009
- Born: 1940; Tarar Khel, Kashmir, British India (present-day Azad Kashmir, Pakistan)
- Died: 28 August 2018 (aged 77–78); Attock, Punjab, Pakistan
- Burial place: Tarar Khel Tehsil, Azad Kashmir, Pakistan
- Military career
- Allegiance: Pakistan
- Branch: Pakistan Army
- Service years: 1960—1965
- Rank: Sepoy
- Service number: 335139
- Unit: 4 Azad Kashmir Regiment
- Conflicts: Indo-Pakistani War of 1965; Operation Gibraltar
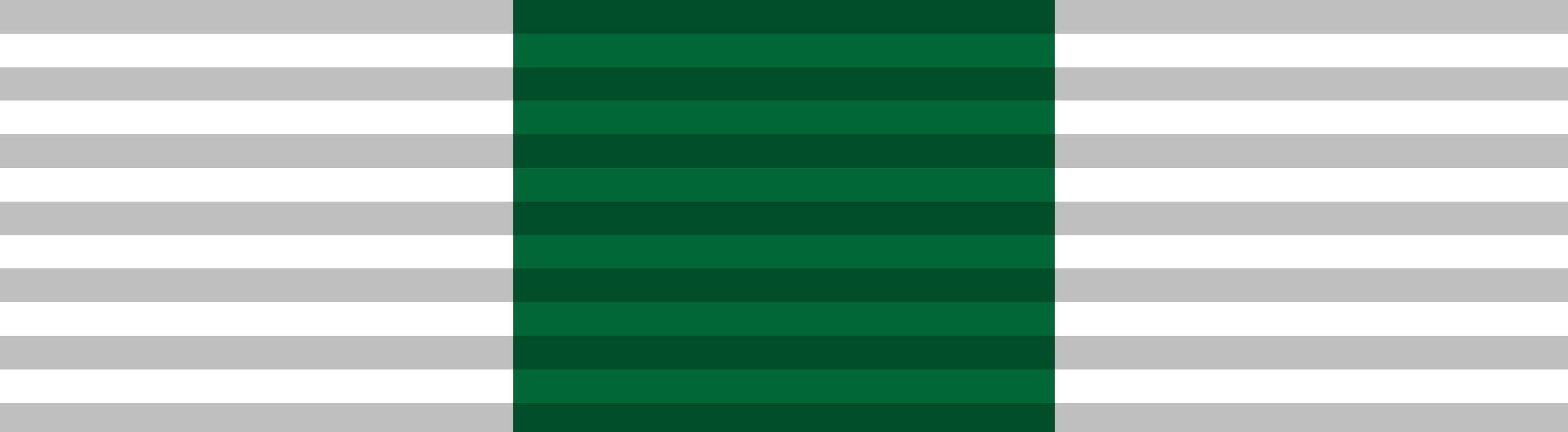
- Awards: Sitara-e-Jurat

Sepoy Maqbool Hussain Khan (1940 — 28 August 2018) was a Pakistani soldier who was well known for his capture and imprisonment for four decades (40 years) in Indian military jails when he was wounded during the Indo-Pakistani War of 1965 and subsequently taken unofficially as a prisoner by Indian troops. Due to the torture inflicted upon him, including the removal of his nails, he was declared mentally unstable.

== Capture in 1965 and subsequent torture ==
Following Hussain's capture during the war, the Indians did not register his legal status as a prisoner of war (POW) under the international law of war, stripping him of certain rights that he would otherwise be entitled to by international law. While in the custody of Indian forces, Hussain was notoriously subjected to severe torture by interrogators and remained defiant when he was demanded to give up any information he knew to jeopardize Pakistan's security. He was regularly harassed by his captors and put under pressure to insult his nation with various phrases such as "Pākistān Murdābād" (Hindi: पाकिस्तान मुर्दाबाद – lit: "Death to Pakistan"), to which he was known to actively respond with "Pākistān Zindābād" (Urdu: پاکستان زِنده باد – lit: "Long Live Pakistan").

His persistent refusal to oblige his Indian captors angered them, and they proceeded to cut out Hussain's tongue and rip out his fingernails. Over the next 40 years, Hussain remained in an Indian prison, where he would regularly write "Long Live Pakistan" on the walls of his cell with his blood.

== Return to Pakistan ==
He was released on 17 September 2005 during a prisoner exchange between India and Pakistan at the Wagah-Attari border crossing.

Upon his return to Pakistan, Hussain had no family left to go to, and his mental and physical state had reduced to the point where he would only respond with his rank and military service number whenever he was asked any questions by passersby. Hussain managed to find his way to a Pakistan Army garrison in Azad Kashmir and repeatedly wrote down his rank and service number on a piece of paper. After much inquiry, Hussain's service in the Indo-Pakistani War of 1965 was discovered and full accommodations began to be made by the military for him.

== Awards ==
On 23 March 2009, Sepoy Maqbool Hussain of the 41 Azad Kashmir Regiment was awarded the Sitara-e-Jurat for his gallantry during the war.

== Death ==
Hussain died on 28 August 2018 in the city of Attock, Punjab. He was a native of Tarar Khel, Sudhanoti District in Kashmir.

=== Burial ===
He was buried in his hometown of Tarar Khel, Azad Kashmir. His mother had waited for his return for as long as she lived and when she died she wrote in her will that the people bury her at the entrance of her village, so when her son would come back home, she'd be the first to welcome him.

== In popular culture ==
The Pakistan Armed Forces media wing, the ISPR and Interflow Communications Limited co-produced a drama series named Sipahi Maqbool Hussain, a biopic of him that aired April 2008 on Pakistan Television (PTV) and TV One in April 2008.
