= Ghani Akbar =

Pakistani fighter pilot

Squadron Leader Ghani Akbar SJ
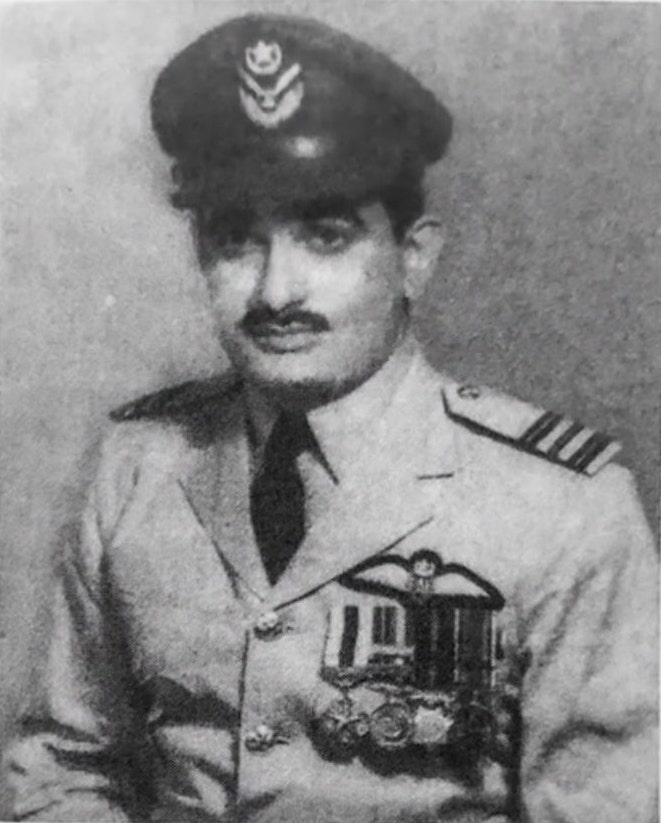
- Ghani Akbar after the 1965 Indo-Pakistani War

Personal details
- Born: Nowshera, Khyber Pakhtunkhwa, British India
- Citizenship: (British Raj) British India (1939-1947); Pakistan (1947 onwards)
- Occupation: Fighter Pilot
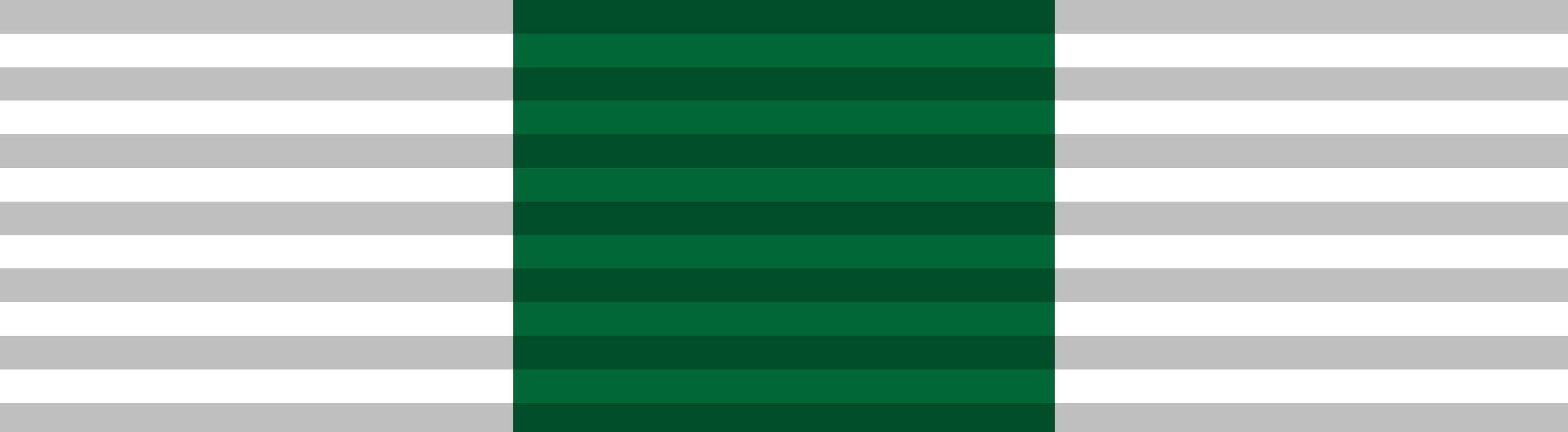
- Awards: Sitara-e-Jurat

Military service
- Branch/service: Pakistan Air Force
- Rank: Squadron Leader
- Unit: No. 19 Squadron PAF
- Battles/wars: Indo-Pakistani War of 1965; Indo-Pakistani War of 1971

Squadron Leader (R) Ghani Akbar SJ (Urdu: غاني أكبر), is a retired fighter pilot with the Pakistan Air Force and recipient of Pakistan's third highest military award for valour, the Sitara-e-Jurat (Star of Valour).

He is best known for his exceptional performance as a fighter pilot during the 1965 Indo-Pakistani War.

== Early life ==
Ghani Akbar was born in a small Pashtun village in Nowshera, prior to the creation of Pakistan. Growing up he participated in the Pakistan Movement, and was a firsthand witness to the violence between Hindus, Sikhs and Muslims during the partition of India.

In 1958, Akbar applied to the Inter Services Selection Board and was accepted into the Pakistan Air Force Academy for training as a fighter pilot.

== Military career ==
=== Indo-Pakistani War of 1965 ===
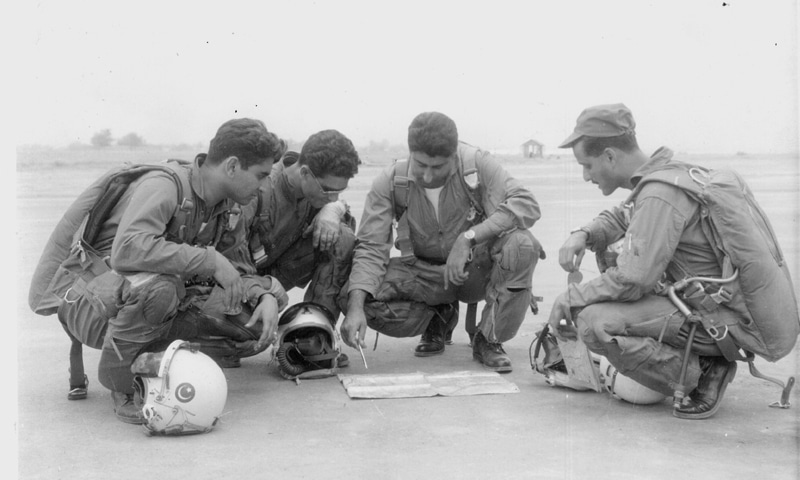
Fighter pilots from the Pakistan Air Force's No. 19 Squadron "Sherdils" planning for the airstrikes on the Indian Airbase of Pathankot during the 1965 Indo-Pakistani war. The Officer Commanding (OC) Sajad Haider is also seen amongst them (2nd from right).

On 6 September 1965, India launched a major offensive toward Lahore to relieve pressure in Kashmir, prompting Pakistan to halt Operation Grand Slam and counterattack in Punjab. That evening, Squadron Leader Sajad Haider led eight PAF F-86 Sabres from No. 19 Squadron in a strike on the Pathankot Air Base. Reaching the target around 5:30 p.m., they heavily damaged the airfield and destroyed more than a dozen IAF aircraft, including newly acquired MiG-21s, leaving the base inoperable for the rest of the war.

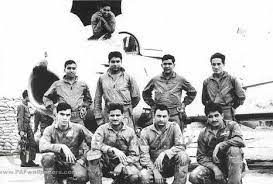
Strike team of Pathankot airfield - Flt Lt Ghani Akbar (sitting 1st from right) with Sqn Ldr Sajad Haider (standing 2nd from left) and other members of No. 19 sqn (1965)

Ghani Akbar (who at the time was a Flight Lieutenant) was flying in the eighth position, and was therefore the last man to drop his bombs over the airbase. However, upon dropping his payload he was unsatisfied with the damage he had inflicted, and spotted multiple other IAF targets still intact.

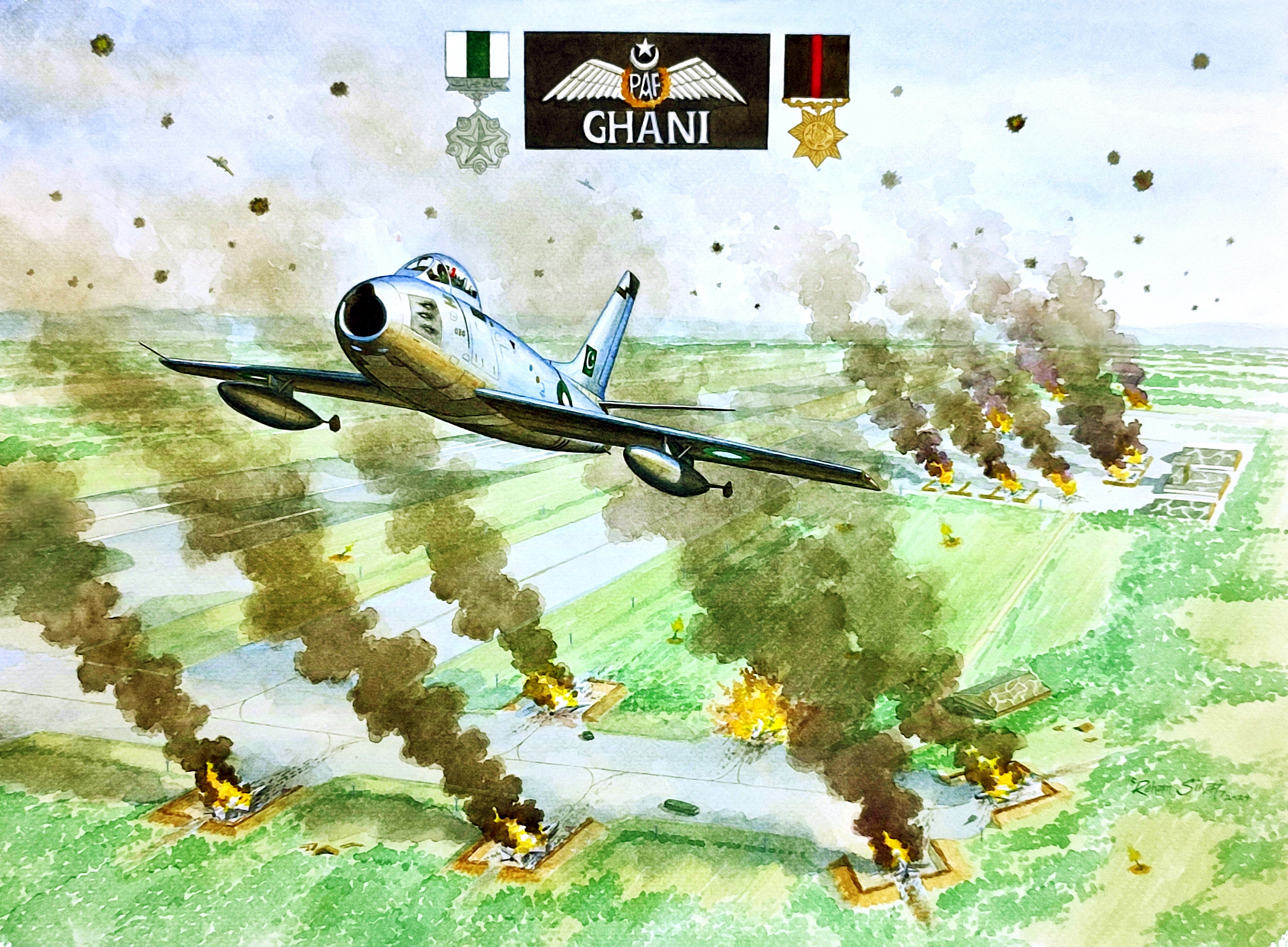
An artist's rendition of a Ghani Akbar during the PAF raid at Pathankot in India. Medal on the left is the Sitara-e-Jurat, medal on the right is Sitara-e-Harb 1965.

Akbar doubled back, and despite being ordered to retreat by his commanding officers, he initiated a second attack, and proceeded to destroy another IAF MiG-21 aircraft. Upon completing his second attack, Akbar realized he was extremely low on fuel and would be unable to reach Peshawar in time to land safely. Fearing that he would have to eject over Indian territory, Akbar swiftly retreated, and despite facing heavy anti-air fire and low visibility due to smog, he successfully landed at a PAF Base in Sargodha. Throughout his career as a fighter pilot, Akbar initially flew the American North American F-86 Sabre, and later the Canadair Sabre (Canadian variant), which he cited as superior.

=== Sitara-e-Jurat ===
The Sitara-e-Jurat citation reads:

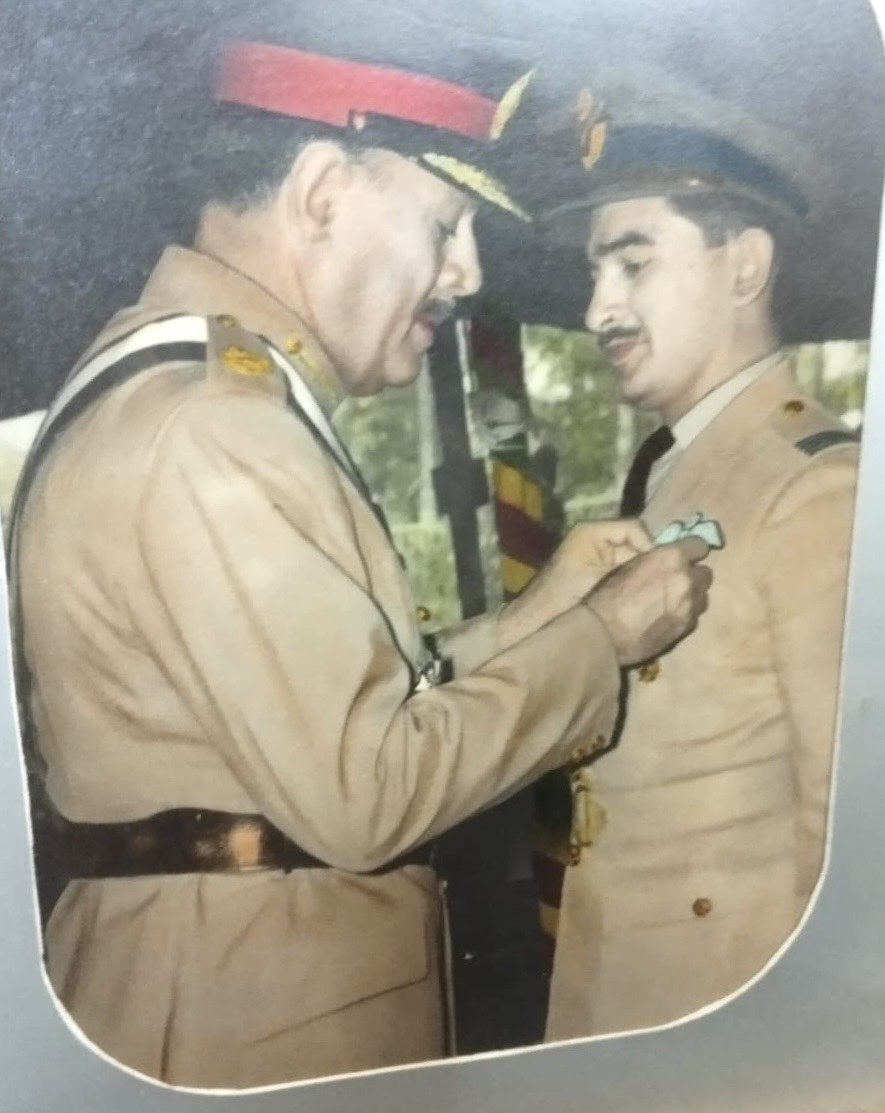
Flight Lieutenant Ghani Akbar being awarded the Sitara-e-Jurat by Field Marshal Ayub Khan

CITATION
FLIGHT LIEUTENANT GHANI AKBAR

Flight Lieutenant Ghani Akbar flew 13 ground attack and 12 air defence missions during the Indo-Pakistan War. He destroyed one aircraft in a ground strike mission and was credited with 5 tanks destroyed and 5 damaged during close support missions. Throughout he flew aggressively, fearlessly and in a most professional manner. For his flying ability, determination and courage he was awarded Sitara-i-Juraat.

== Awards and decorations ==
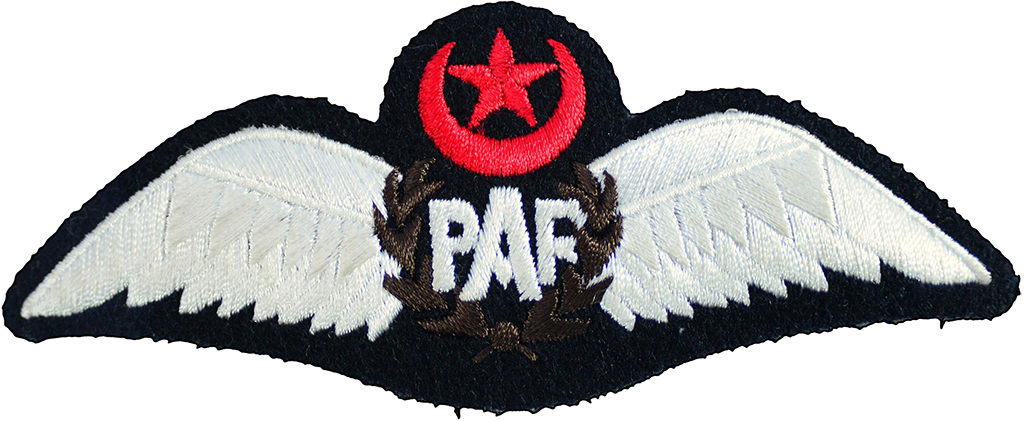

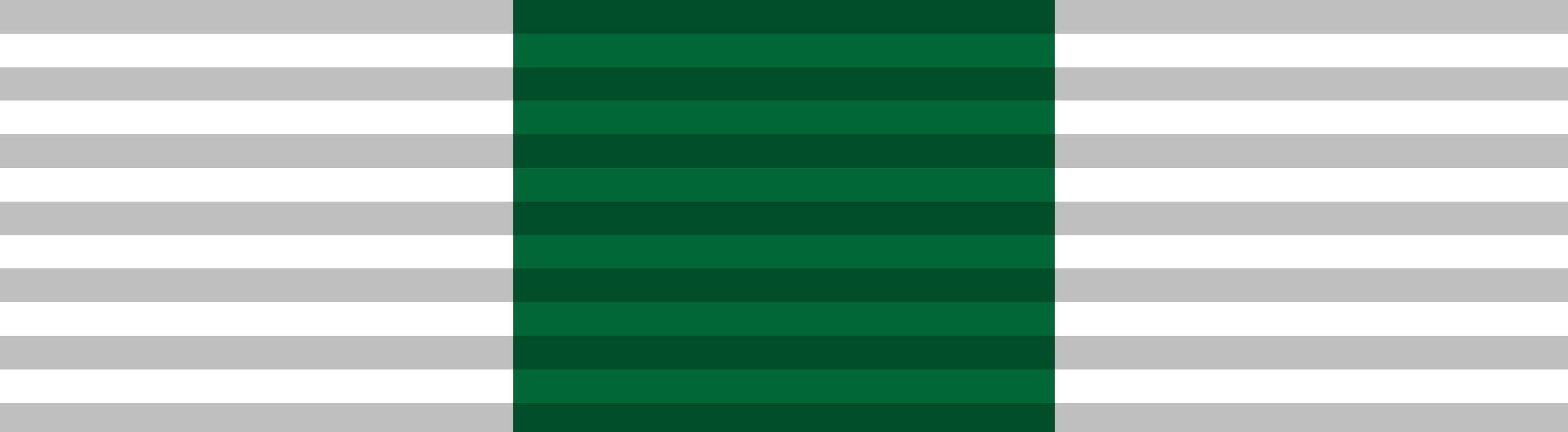

PAF GD(P) Badge RED (More than 3000 Flying Hours)
Sitara-e-Jurat (Star of Courage) 1965 War	Tamgha-e-Jang 1971 War (War Medal 1971)	Sitara-e-Harb 1971 War (War Star 1971)
Tamgha-e-Diffa (General Service Medal)	Sitara-e-Harb 1965 War (War Star 1965)	Tamgha-e-Jang 1965 War (War Medal 1965)
