= Light Commando Battalion =

Pakistani special military units

Light Commando Battalions
- گردان‌های کماندویی سبک كتائب الكوماندوز الخفيفة
- Founded: Since the insurgency in Khyber Pakhtunkhwa
- Country: Pakistan
- Allegiance: Pakistan Armed Forces
- Branch: Pakistan Army
- Type: Commando
- Role: Special operations Counter-terrorism
- Size: Battalion-size
- Part of: Pakistan Army
- Headquarters: None

The Light Commando Battalions (LCB) are commando units of the Pakistan Army, tasked with special operations and counter-terrorism. Each battalion is affiliated with, but not part of, a Pakistan Army infantry regiment, instead being part an Army Corps. The Light Commando Battalions play a similar role to the US Army's Ranger Regiment.

== Known Operations ==
The LCB (Punjab) took part in defending military bases, which were attacked by militants on 15 August 2014. On 15 April 2015, the LCB (Punjab) held an open day for select members of the public to let them see the work of the unit, as part of a public awareness campaign. A company from Light Commando Battalion (Punjab) was assigned for the security measures of the 2021 Tour By The New Zealand Cricket Team before it was cancelled.

In June 2017, 2nd LCB (Baloch) participated in a raid, with other units, on a suspected militant base in Mastung, Balochistan.

The LCB (Azad Kashmir) participated in the Pakistan Day parade in Islamabad on 23 March 2022.

== List ==
- 1st Light Commando Battalion (Punjab) (Al-Mirsab)
- 2nd Light Commando Battalion (Baloch) (The pioneers)
- 3rd Light Commando Battalion (Frontier Force)
- 4th Light Commando Battalion (Azad Kashmir) (Lazzaz)
- 5th Light Commando Battalion (Sindh)
- 6th Light Commando Battalion (Northern Light Infantry)
- 7th Light Commando Battalion (Punjab) (Al Mubarizun)
- 8th Light Commando Battalion (Baloch) (Al Khursan)
- 9th Light Commando Battalion (Frontier Force)
- 10th Light Commando Battalion (Azad Kashmir) (Al Faqqar)

== See also ==
- List of commando units
- List of military special forces units
