= Mujahida Hussain Bibi =

Pakistani veteran (died 1947)

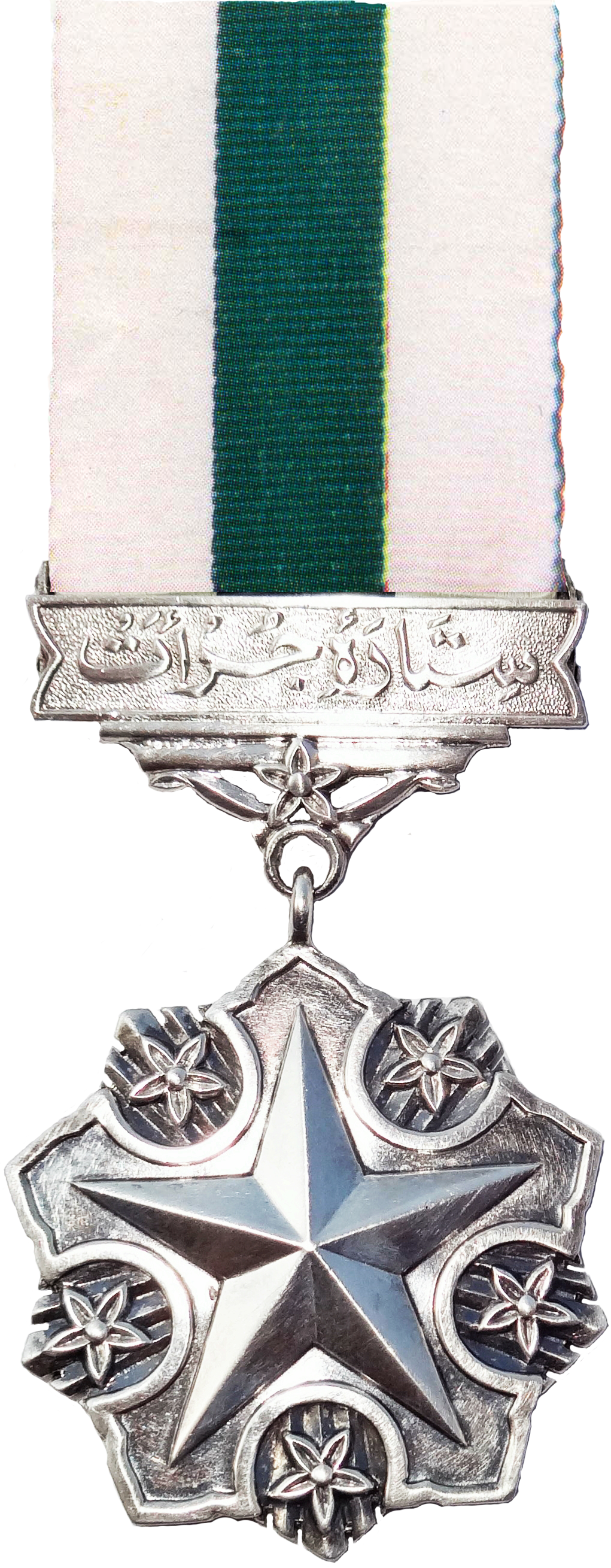
Sitara-e-Jurat Mujahida Hussain Bibi Shaheeda

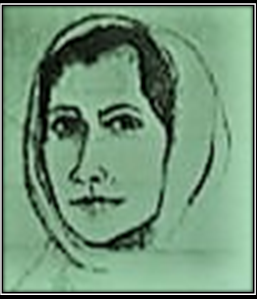
- Born: Jammu and Kashmir (princely state)
- Died: 7 October 1947; Thorar, Azad Kashmir, Dominion of Pakistan
- Military career
- Allegiance: Pakistan
- Branch: Pakistan Army
- Service years: 1945-1947
- Rank: Foot soldier
- Units: Azad Kashmir Regular Force (Pakistan Army); 5 Azad Kashmir Regiment (HAIDER DIL)
- Conflicts: Indo-Pakistani War of 1947 †
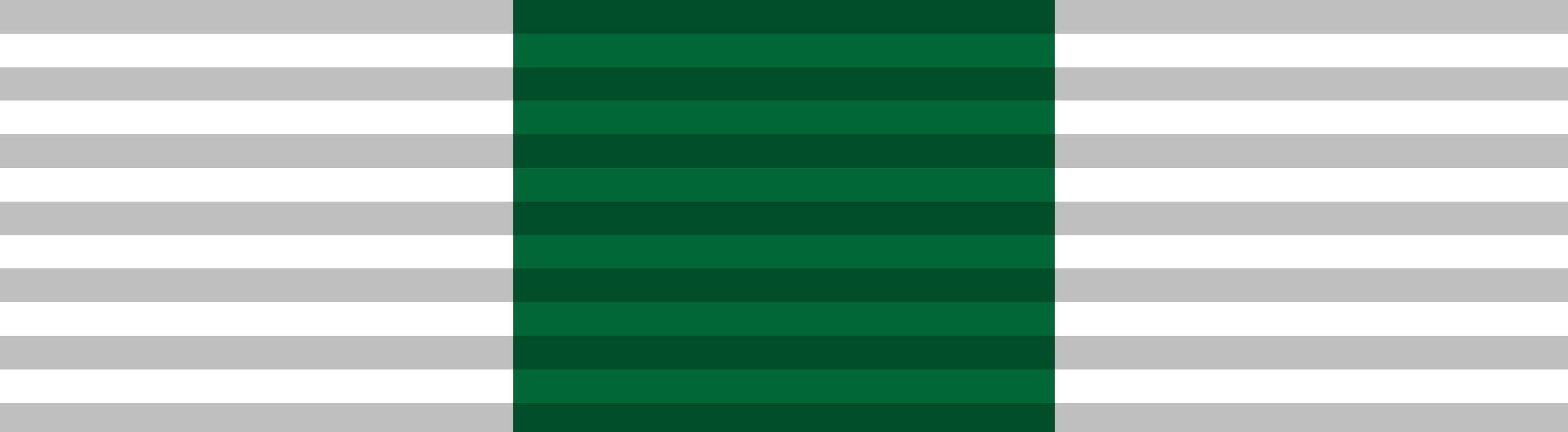
- Awards: Sitara-e-Jurat (Pakistan's first female recipient)

Mujahida Hussain Bibi usually known as Bibi Sahiba or Shaheeda Mai Hussain Bibi registered as a regular soldier in the Local Azad Kashmir Army who fought in the First Kashmir War. Bibi Sahiba received third highest award for her valour, the Sitara-e-Jurat, becoming the first female recipient of the award. She was a part of the 5th Sudhnoti Battalion of AK forces later renamed as 5 AK Regt (HAIDER DIL). She is also widely regarded as the first female shaheed of First Kashmir War. She was part of the charging group, when she was injured with a bullet and took her last breath leaning over a stone on 7 October 1947.

== Background ==
Bibi Sahiba came from a Rajput family (Mangral Rajpoot) and grew up in Thorar, Jammu and Kashmir. She joined the Pakistan Army, registering as a soldier in the 5th Battalion of the Azad Kashmir Regular Force, commanded by Captain Sher Khan in the Himalayan foothills. Chaos in princely state of Kashmir started brewing in 1930, after revolt against Maharajah became people’s resistance in 1946, picked momentum in the spring of 1947, and reached its climax in the summers; making Kashmiris’ fight for their denied right of self respect; or else century old struggle of liberation against regime, where social, economic and political rights had been snatched, and above all dignity and identity of its people. In 1946, before partition, a strong force of Maharajah State Forces stationed at the Garrison of Poonch had marched suddenly into the towns and villages and whole of the people’s property, real or personal, was seized by them. The Muslims of the State were only to fall victim to this iniquitous policy of Maharajah. The last year of British India turned to be turmoil of sordid reaction of the few princely states' to independence of Subcontinent, that untroubled Maharajah of Jammu & Kashmir, Maharajah Hari Singh, ascended to the throne in 1925, led from his majestic palace to be poorly decisive in the world’s greatest partition.

The army of State of Jammu and Kashmir, J&K Dogra regiments consisted of one cavalry regiment and twelve infantry regiments with extra garrison companies. They built forts, posts, police stations and became symbol of oppression in Kashmir after quelling many expeditions in the Kashmir territory that often proved to be ferocious including suppressing of one rebellion in the 1830s.

The movement of Kashmir was distinct in its origin that people demonstrated traditional heritage in organizing the freedom fight in groups of platoon and company strength, later to be regimented into Azad Kashmir Regular Forces (AKRF). This was intended to organize the groups or else could become ganged groups in later years.

The creation of Pakistan in the hinterland where rested centuries old bondage of people over historical and cultural crossroads, turned to be resource of people’s hopes that generations dreamt of liberation. The dramatic turn of events by the middle of September 1947 had gripped the mode of the people.

The 5th Battalion held the attack, now had been closed at Chirikot-Degear Defile and for all reasons to be fierce. The stiff resistance of the 5th Battalion had prolonged it to five days stand off, during which hand-to-hand encounters were frequent.

The defile turned to be centre of gravity for opposing sides. 6th Sudhnuti Regiment (6th Battalion) under Captain Munawwar Hussain Khan reinforced the forward positions. However an important portion of defile had been occupied and its loss would be of opening bottle flushing the wrath downtrodden into valleys.

== Death ==
Hari Singh was reigning as the Maharaja of Jammu and Kashmir and had his state forces stationed in all over his state including in Poonch region. Bibi Sahiba was a part of the charging group (5 AKRF) during fighting around the Chirikot-Degear defile. She fought bravely, supplying ammunition to Sudhan soldiers fighting in the region. While undertaking this duty, she received a bullet wound and subsequently died at 0500 hours on 7 October 1947.Bibi Sahiba was part of the charging group to-be- martyred tale that witnessed mountains of Himalaya standing large, white and pure against the cloudless sky, when she was injured with a bullet and took her last breath while leaning over a stone at 0500 hours on 7 October 1947.

The race against time had been won with blood. The counter attack succeeded and groups pursued enemy all the way to Poonch and captured few light machine-guns, rifles and a sizable quantity of ammunition that helped to shoot down one of the strafing aircraft. Bibi Sahiba in recognition of her act of exemplary courage and valour was awarded Mujahid-i-Hydri (now having equivalence with the operational award of Sitara-e-Jurat).

The freedom struggle of Kashmir left behind assortment of people’s sacrifices, stories, their origin and their dreamy tales about freedom. This is the story of "Mujahida Hussain Bibi" of 5th Jatha, now 5th Battalion, Azad Kashmir Regiment, the first female of Pakistan awarded with Sitara-e-Jurat.

== Awards and decorations ==
Mujahida Hussain Bibi was awarded Pakistan's third highest military award (Sitara-e-Jurat) for her exemplary courage and bravery.

Sitara-e-Jurat (Pakistan's Third Highest Military Award)

Sitara-e-Jurat (SJ)
