= 1st Battalion, Azad Kashmir Regiment =

Pakistan Army infantry unit

- Founded: 6 October 1947; 20 September 1971
- Country: Pakistan
- Branch: Pakistan Army
- Role: Infantry
- Size: 1 battalion
- Part of: 111th Infantry Brigade
- Engagements: Indo-Pakistani War of 1947; Indo-Pakistani War of 1965; Indo-Pakistani War of 1971

Commanders
- Previous commander: Lieutenant-Colonel Nausherwan Khan

The 1st Battalion, Azad Kashmir Regiment is an infantry battalion of the Azad Kashmir Regiment of the Pakistan Army. Operationally it is assigned to the 111th Infantry Brigade, carrying out ceremonial duties and acting as part of the presidential guard.

== History ==
The battalion was originally formed at Kotli on 28 November 1947 at the start of the Kashmir Conflict, but this was backdated to 6 October 1947 by Colonel Khan Muhammad Khan. It served as part of the paramilitary Azad Kashmir Regular Forces and in February 1948 was operating in Handwara with a strength of 800 personnel and commanded by Lieutenant-Colonel Nausherwan Khan.

The battalion subsequently participated in the Indo-Pakistani War of 1965 and the Indo-Pakistani War of 1971. It was transferred to the Pakistan Army on 20 September 1971 when the Regular Forces became the Azad Kashmir Regiment.

== Notable officers ==
Notable officer from 1AK Regt is Lieutenant General Ikram Ul Haq Ch R Who served as Corps Comd Gujranwala as well.
