= United Nations peacekeeping missions involving Pakistan =

Pakistan has served in 46 United Nations peacekeeping missions in 29 countries around the world. As of 2023, United Nations (UN) statistics show that 168 Pakistani UN peacekeepers have fallen since 1948. The biggest Pakistani loss occurred on 5 June 1993 in Mogadishu. Pakistan joined the United Nations on 30 September 1947, despite opposition from Afghanistan because of the Durand Line issue. The Pakistan Armed Forces are the fifth largest contributor of troops towards UN peacekeeping efforts, behind India and Rwanda.

Peacekeeping, as defined by the United Nations, is the practice of helping countries torn by conflict create conditions for sustainable peace. UN peacekeepers — usually military officers and regular troops alongside civilian personnel from many countries — monitor and observe peace processes that emerge in regions post-war and assist ex-combatants in implementing the peace agreements they have signed. Such assistance comes in many forms, including confidence-building measures, power-sharing arrangements, electoral support, strengthening the rule of law, and economic and social development. Pakistan's contributions have consisted mainly of regular military personnel, but also include paramilitary troops and civilian police officers as peacekeepers. All operations must include the resolution of conflicts through the use of force to be considered valid under the charter of the United Nations.

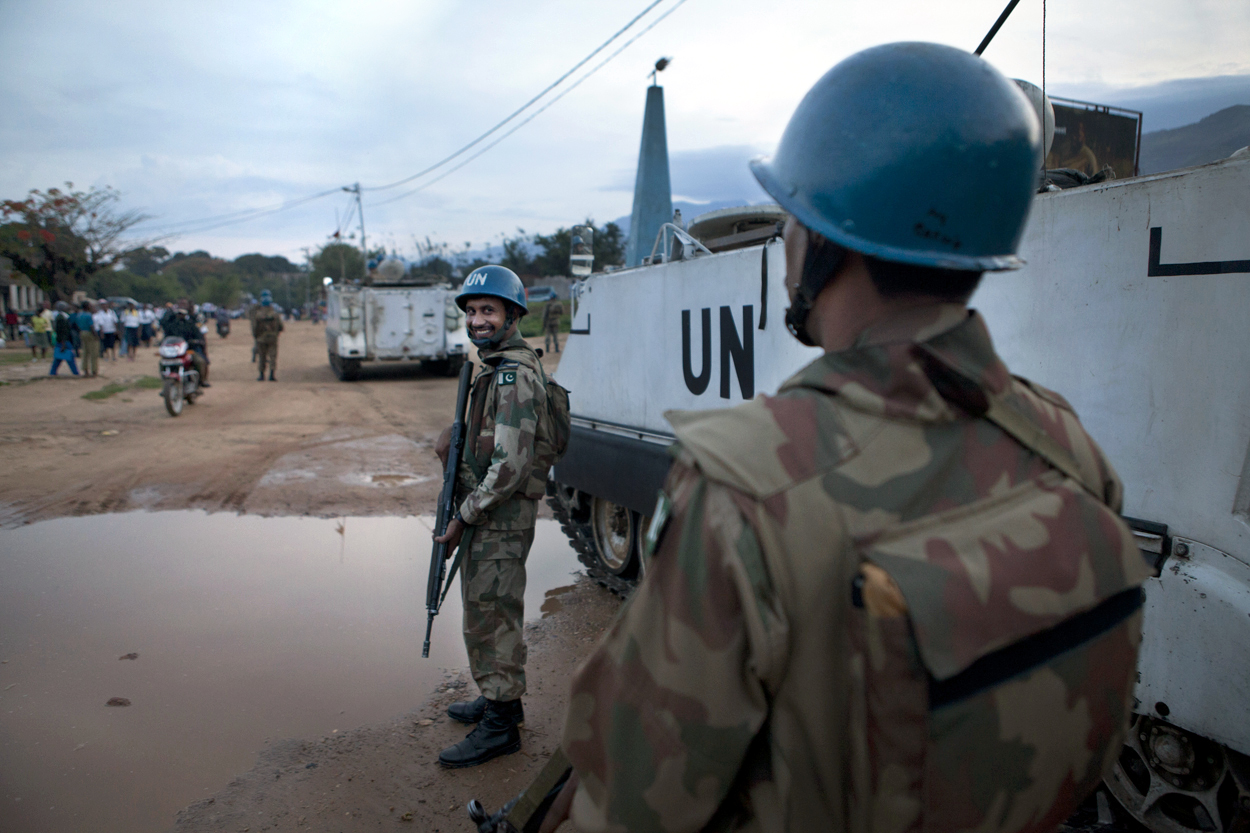
Pakistani troops under a UN peacekeeping coalition patrolling the streets of Uvira in South Kivu, Democratic Republic of the Congo

== Foundation ==
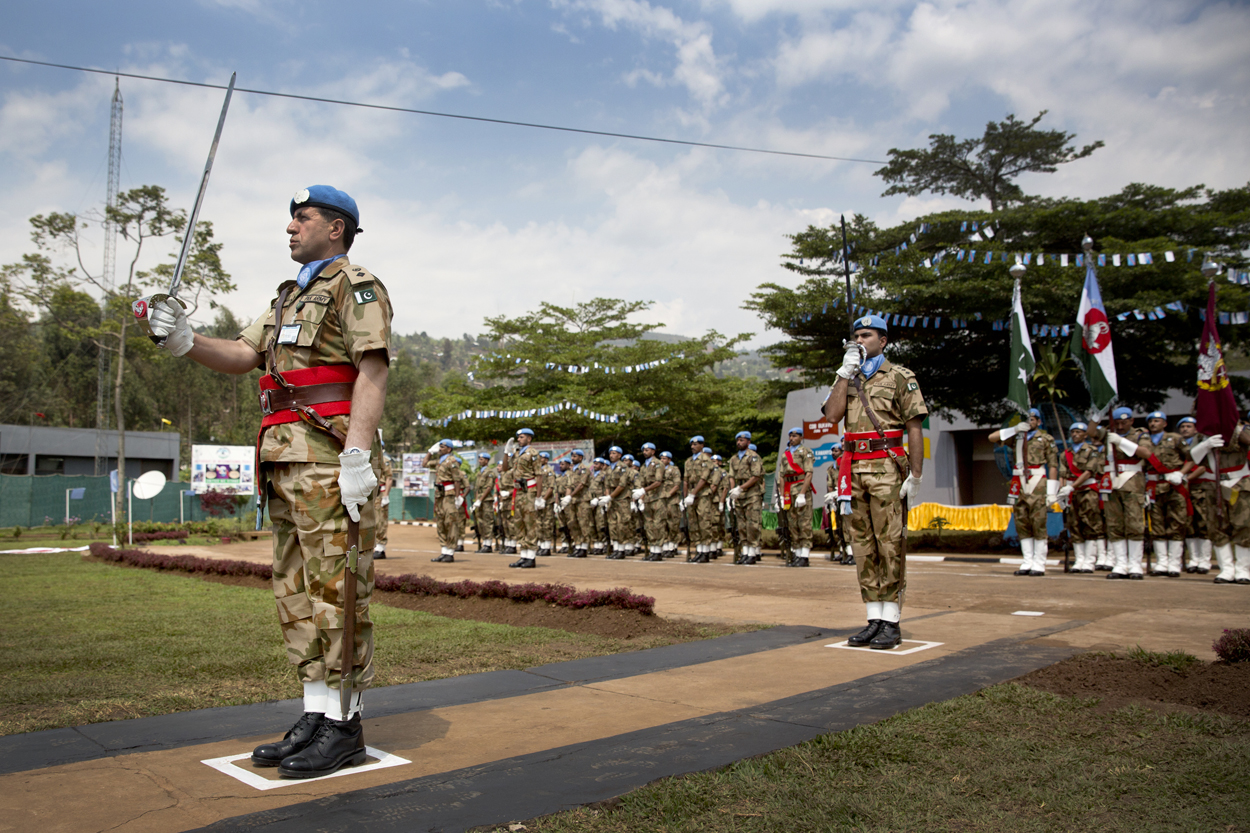
Pakistani soldiers supporting MONUSCO

Our foreign policy is one of friendliness and goodwill towards all the nations of the world. We believe in the principle of honesty and fair play in national and international dealings and are prepared to make our utmost contribution to the promotion of peace and prosperity among the nations of the world. Pakistan will never be found lacking in extending its material and moral support to the oppressed and suppressed peoples of the world and in upholding the principles of the United Nations Charter."

— Quaid-e-Azam Muhammad Ali Jinnah, founder and 1st Governor-General of Pakistan

== Completed missions ==
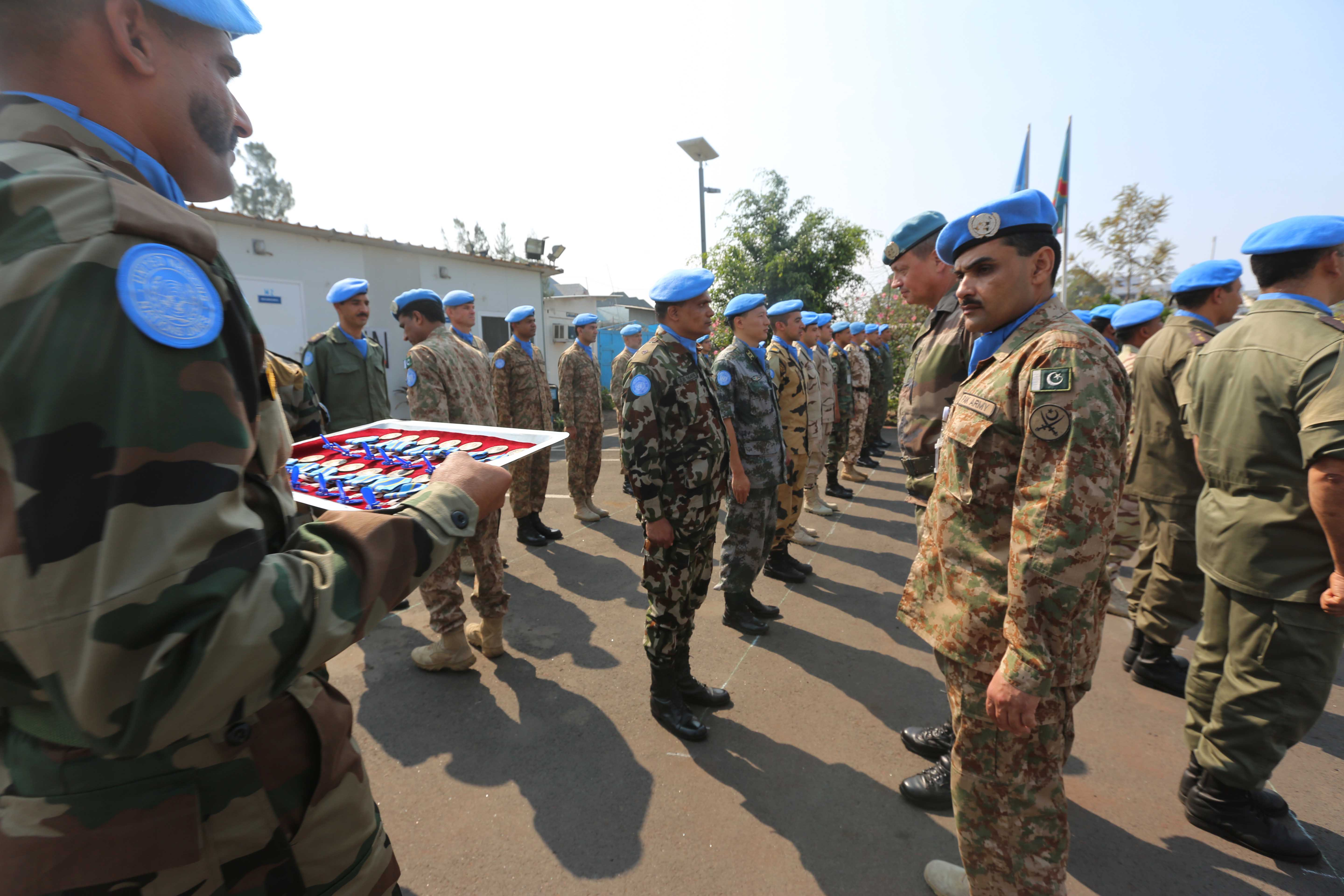
Goma, DR Congo- 25 Officers and 4 Warrant officers from various troop-contributing countries were awarded the UN Medal for participating in joint international military and police operations.

=== Congo (August 1960 to May 1964) ===
Contribution: 400 Troops, Ordnance, Transport units and Staff Personnel
Casualties: None.

United Nations Operation in the Congo was a United Nations peacekeeping force in Congo that was established after United Nations Security Council Resolution 143 of July 14, 1960.It was active during the Congo Crisis. During the operation Pakistan provided logistic support under Lt Col Naseer, the first ever Pakistani officer commanding an Ordnance Company in United Nation, during movement of troops to and from Congo and inland movement of the United Nation troops. Pakistan Army Ordnance Corps and Pakistan Army Supply Corps (ASC) organized the whole operation. It continued uninterrupted from 1960 to 1964 with four Independent Army Supply and Ordnance Corps companies, consisting of about 100 personnel each. The movement control entailed through sea, air, rail, river and road transport. A systematic organization was created to ensure foolproof administrative arrangements for transportation of troops, weapons, equipment, storage and rations throughout Congo in unfriendly environments by the Pakistani Ordnance troops.

=== West New Guinea (October 1962 - April 1963) ===
Contribution: 1500 Troops
Casualties: None.

United Nations Security Force in New Guinea, (UNSF), after the agreement between comity of nations that the Netherlands would hand over control of Western New Guinea to the United Nation by 1 October 1962, prior to its take over by Indonesia for subsequent plebiscite.

In these circumstances, when the world was focusing its eyes on the United Nations Security Force, the Pakistani composite force comprising 14th Punjab Regiment, commanded by Lt Col Amanullah Khan, two companies of 18 Punjab Regiment and supporting elements, disembarked on the coast of Sorong after completing 6000 miles sea voyage on 8 October 1962. The responsibility of this contingent stretched over hundreds of miles. In order to accomplish the assigned mission the companies were deployed at Merauke, Fak Fak, Sorong and Kaimana.

The Battalion Headquarters were positioned at Biak. Pakistani troops effectively prevented skirmishes between Papuans and Indonesian troops. On one such occasion Pakistani troops rushed swiftly to Kaimana area on 14 January 1963, to avoid a bloody conflict. In another incident, Pakistani troops (a company strength) were moved to Monokwari by air in response to a distress signal sent out to restore law and order situation in the area which had been threatened by Papuan Volunteer Corps. On reaching the spot, it revealed that 350 PVK troops were in a mutinous mood at the Arfak Camp. Pakistani peace keepers restored the situation very tactfully without spilling a single drop of blood. The Pakistani contingent ensured smooth withdrawal of Dutch troops without any ensuing battles with the Indonesian Army. It also helped Indonesian troops in taking over the control swiftly in a conducive atmosphere.

=== Namibia (April 1989 to March 1990) ===
Contribution: 20 military observers.
Casualties: None.

United Nations Transition Assistance Group in Namibia. The United Nations operation in Namibia marked the culmination of 70 years of pressure by the organized international community - through the League of Nations - and then the United Nations to enable the people of the Territory to live in peace, freedom and independence. Its climax came shortly after midnight on 21 March 1990, when the South African flag was lowered, the Namibian flag was raised, after the Namibian War of Independence and the Secretary-General of the United Nations, Mr. Javier Pérez de Cuéllar, administered the oath of office to Mr. Sam Nujoma as President of the newly independent State.

=== Kuwait (December 1991 to October 1993) ===
Contribution: 1136 total (troops and civilians).
Casualties: None.

United Nations Iraq–Kuwait Observation Mission (UNIKOM), was established on April 9, 1991, following the Gulf War by Security Council Resolution 689 (1991) and fully deployed by early May. In the aftermath of the 1991 Gulf war, Kuwait found itself confronted with colossal post-war problems. These included the reclamation of the entire land of Kuwait which had been turned into a battlefield by Iraq and the Allied Forces. Almost the whole territory was infested with lethal mines, huge stockpiles of ammunition and explosives and vast dugouts, which made the normal use of land impossible.

Finally the job was separately entrusted to Pakistan and six other countries. Pakistan was assigned the most difficult area in the north of Kuwait city. It was spread over 3000 square kilometers. Subsequently, reclamation of Bubiyan island was also entrusted to Pakistan.

The operation was carried out by a task force of Pakistan Army engineers belonging to Frontier Works Organization.

=== Haiti (1993 to 1996) ===
Contribution: 525 troops.
Casualties: None.

United Nations Mission in Haiti (UNMIH), during the 1991 coup and military rule in Haiti on the request of the United Nations, Pakistan provided one infantry battalion to form part of UNMIH. This battalion, PAKBAT, arrived in Haiti in March 1995 and was deployed in Cap-Haïtien. At that time this area faced extremely volatile security situation and was also reputed to be the hotbed of political restlessness. In order to improve the security situation, PAKBAT started to discharge its responsibilities with an extensive patrolling program covering north, northeast and central regions. These patrols quickly became conduit for cordial relationship between the local population and peace keepers. It gave confidence to soldiers wearing blue berets, the Haitian National Police and other government functionaries which led to degree of stability and cooperation in the region. PAKBAT also played a significant role in holding free and fair elections in the northern reaches of Haiti which was appreciated by local as well as foreign media. For humanitarian assistance, food distribution among impoverished people of Haiti was one pro gramme. While much of the food was supplied by NGOs, PAKBAT troops even distributed their own quota of rations to hard pressed population, hence earning good-will of the local population. Scarcity of potable water being another serious problem, PAKBAT surveyed region's potable water requirements, pinpointing locations where water points were urgently required and helped NGOs to repair and install-water pumps and bring water to remote areas. On one such occasion, PAKBAT learnt of an orphanage that had no potable water. A patrol quickly supplied bottled water and biscuits and installed a water pump.

=== Cambodia (March 1992 to November 1993) ===
Contribution: 1106 (troops, mine clearance and staff).
Casualties: None.

United Nations Transitional Authority in Cambodia (UNTAC). When the United Nations requested the member countries to contribute troops to UNTAC, Pakistan, in keeping with its previous record, responded positively and 2nd Battalion of the Azad Kashmir Regiment was dispatched. This contingent formed part of a force of 15900 personnel from 32 countries. They were tasked to ensure the withdrawal of all foreign forces, supervision of cease-fire, disarmament and demobilization of Cambodia's warring factions.

=== Balkan countries (March 1992 to February 1996) ===
External videos
- Pakistan army operations in Croatia for peace

Contribution: 3000 troops.
Casualties: 6. United Nations Protection Force (UNPROFOR), recognizing the commendable performance of the Pakistan Army Contingents as United Nations peacekeepers in Somalia and Cambodia, the United Nations requested the Government of Pakistan to contribute troops to the United Nations Protection Force in Bosnia-Herzegovina. A 3000 strong contingent consisting of two battalion groups and a National Support (NS) Headquarters left for Bosnia and Croatia in May 1994.

=== Somalia (March 1992 to February 1996) ===
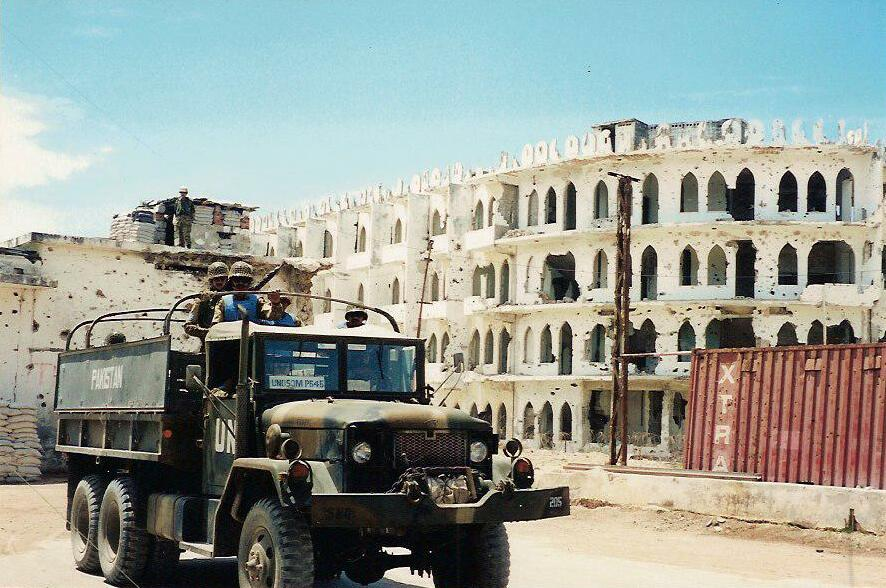
A Pakistani UNOSOM armed convoy making rounds in Somalia.

Contribution: 7200 troops.
Casualties: 39.

United Nations Operation in Somalia I (UNOSOM I), during the Somali Civil War, Pakistan was the first country to respond to the call of the United Nations. On 14 September 1992 five hundred Pakistani troops arrived in Mogadishu to launch the United Nation humanitarian campaign. Deployment of the security force was preceded by the arrival of an advance party of 50 United Nation observers.

=== Rwanda (October 1993 – March 1996) ===
Contribution: 7 military observers.
Casualties: None.

United Nations Assistance Mission for Rwanda (UNAMIR). was originally established to help implement the Arusha Peace Agreement signed by the Rwandese parties on 4 August 1993. UNAMIR's mandate and strength were adjusted on a number of occasions in the face of the tragic events of the genocide and the changing situation in the country. UNAMIR's mandate came to an end on 8 March 1996. The mission was headed by Mr. Shaharyar M. Khan from Pakistan as the special representative of the secretary-general and head of mission. After the closure of UNAMIR, Mr. Khan continued as the Secretary-General's Special Representative through April 1996.

=== Angola (February 1995 to June 1997) ===
Contribution: 14 military observers.
Casualties: None.

Established to assist the Government of Angola and the União Nacional para a Independência Total de Angola (UNITA) in restoring peace and achieving national reconciliation on the basis of the Peace Accords for Angola, signed on 31 May 1991, the Lusaka Protocol signed on 20 November 1994, and relevant Security Council resolutions.

=== Eastern Slavonia (May 1996 – August 1997) ===
External videos
- Pakistan army operations in Croatia for peace

Contribution: 1014 troops and staff.
Casualties: None.

United Nations Transitional Authority in Eastern Slavonia, Baranja and Western Sirmium (UNTAES). After the Demilitarization Agreement signed between the Croatian Government and the Serb representatives in November 1995 at Erdut, the United Nations was asked to take steps for the implementation of the agreement in war ravaged areas of Eastern Slavonia, Baranya and western Sirmium within a period of thirty days. A 1000-soldiers strong Pakistan Army Contingent joined UNTAES in the first week of May 96 and assumed its duties on 18 May 96 after relieving Belgian troops.

=== Sierra Leone (October 1999 to December 2005) ===
Contribution: 5000 troops.
Casualties: 6.

United Nations mission in Sierra Leone (UNAMSIL). During the mission the UN Security Council approved several requests of military assistance which drew to a final force of 17,500 military personnel, including the 260 military observers, the Council took this decision by its resolution 1346, and, by the same resolution, approved a revised concept of operations. Pakistan being the largest contributor to this mission sent a composite force of three Battalion Groups and one engineer battalion. Mr. Sajjad Akram from the Pakistan Army served as the Force Commander and Chief Military Observer from October 2003 to September 2005.

== Current deployment ==
Start of operation	Name of Operation	Location		Conflict	Contribution
1999	United Nations Organization Mission in the Democratic Republic of the Congo (MONUC)	(Democratic Republic of the Congo)	Democratic Republic of Congo	Second Congo War	3556 Troops.
	Staff/Observers				191 Observers.

- As of April, 2017, total number of troops serving in peacekeeping missions is 7,111 (includes Police, UNMEM and troops).

== See also ==
- Pakistani Armed Forces
- List of countries where UN peacekeepers are currently deployed
- Timeline of UN peacekeeping missions
- Pakistan Armed Forces deployments
