= Azad Pattan =

Village in Azad Jammu & Kashmir

- Village
- Location within Azad Kashmir
- Coordinates: 33.7320°N 73.6032°E
- Country: Pakistan
- State: Azad Kashmir
- District: Sudhanoti
- Elevation: 495 m (1,625 ft)

Languages
  - Official: Urdu
- Time zone: PST

Azad Pattan (Urdu: آزاد پتن), previously Lachman Pattan, is a village near Pallandri in the Sudhanoti District of Azad Kashmir, Pakistan. It is located on border of Punjab and Azad Kashmir on the bank of the Jhelum River.

The Azad Pattan bridge on the Jhelum River connects Islamabad to Rawalakot, Bagh and Pallandri.

The 700.7MW Azad Pattan Hydropower Project is located at the Azad Pattan Bridge.
