= Saif Ali Janjua =

Platoon Commander in the 1947 Indo-Pakistani War

Naik Saif Ali Janjua Nishan-e-Haider
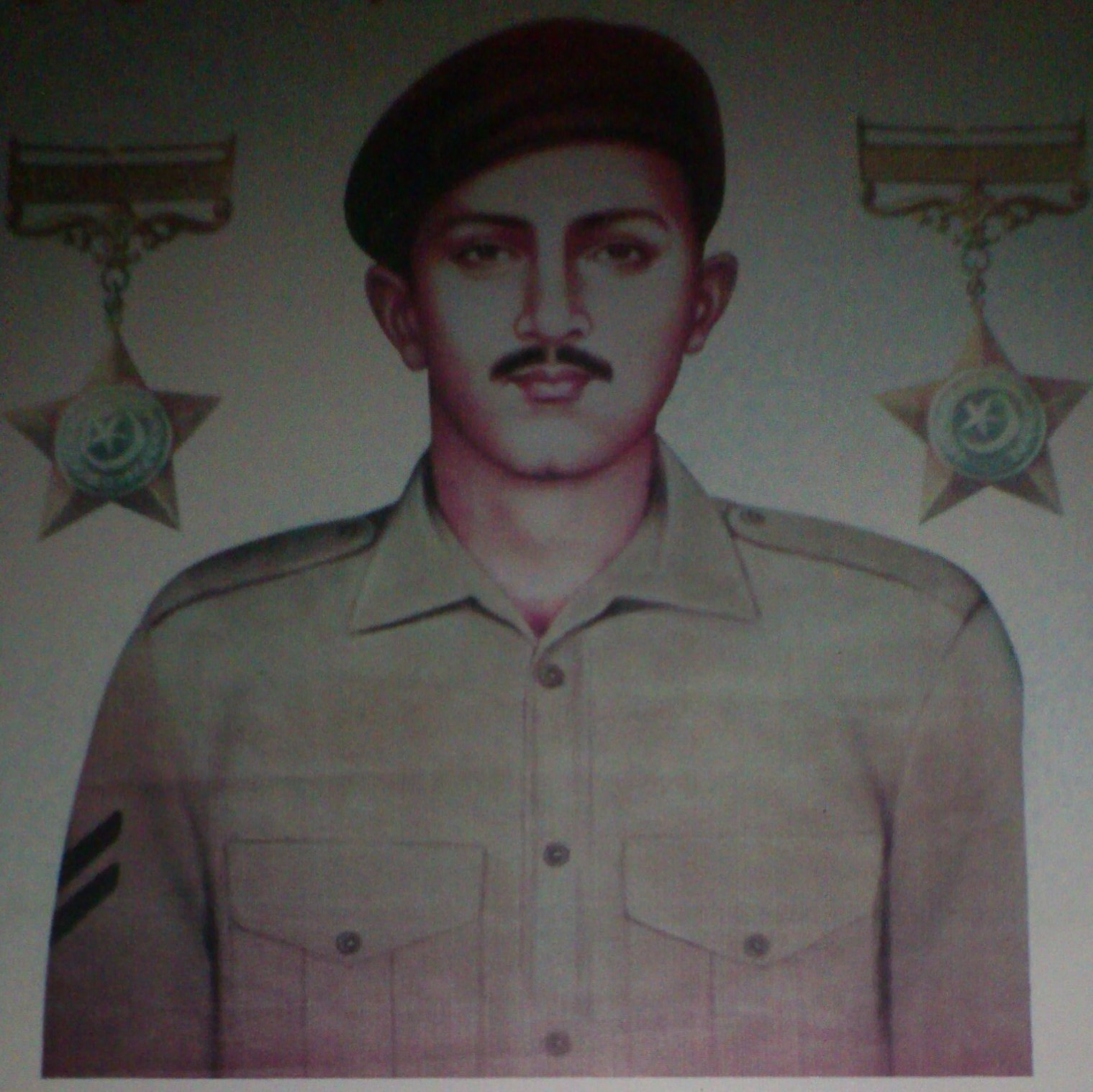
- Born: 23 April 1922; Nakyal, Kotli, Kashmir & Jammu, British India
- Died: 26 October 1948 (aged 26); Mendhar, Jammu and Kashmir
- Spouse: Zohra Bibi
- Children: Muhammad Siddique; Muhammad Raffique; Tasweer Begum
- Military career
- Allegiance: British India (1941-47); Pakistan (1947-48)
- Branch: British Indian Army (1941-47); Pakistan Army (1947-48)
- Service years: 1941–1948
- Rank: Naik
- Units: British Indian Royal Corps of Engineers (1941-47); 18 AK Regt (1948)
- Conflicts: Second World War; Indo-Pakistani War of 1947 †
- Awards: Hilal-e-Kashmir; Nishan-e-Haider

Naik Saif Ali Janjua (Urdu: سیف علی جنجوعہ; 23 April 1922 — 26 October 1948) was a Pakistani military officer and posthumous war hero. A non-commissioned officer in the Azad Kashmir Regiment, he is best known for being the second recipient of Pakistan's highest military award, the Nishan-e-Haider, which he was awarded posthumously for his actions of valor and gallantry during the Indo-Pakistani War of 1947-1948. He was also the only recipient of the Hilal-e-Kashmir award which was later declared as the equivalent of the Nishan-e-Haider.

He fought in the British Indian Army during the Second World War, and following the partition of India in 1947, he opted for Pakistan and joined the Pakistan Army. During the Indo-Pakistani War of 1947, he served as a platoon commander and was killed in action in the siege of Bhudha Khanna in October 1948.

== Early life ==
Saif Ali Janjua was born into a family of the Punjabi Janjua Rajputs to Malik Muhammad Masoom Khan on 23 April 1922 in Nakyal, Kashmir & Jammu, British India.

== Personal life ==
Janjua was married to Zohra Bibi and had three children, Muhammad Siddique, Muhammad Raffique, and Tasweer Begum.

== Military career ==
=== British Indian Army ===
Saif Ali Janjua was enlisted into the Corps of Engineers in the British Indian Army as a Sepoy on 18 March 1941. He served for four years during World War II and when the war ended, his unit sailed back to the Indian subcontinent and was stationed at Jalandhar and Lahore.

=== Pakistan Army ===
When Pakistan received Independence in 1947, he opted to join the Pakistan Army. On 1 January 1948, with the support of Sardar Fateh Muhammad Karailvi, he established the Haidri Force which was named Sher-e-Riasti Battalion under the command of Lt. Col. Muhammad Sher Khan and later renamed to 18th Battalion. Due to his dedication and leadership qualities, Janjua was promoted to Naik and made Platoon Commander of the Sher-e-Riasti Battalion, now known as 18th Azad Kashmir Regiment.

He inflicted heavy losses on the enemy at Bhudha Khanna and repulsed the attacks of the Indian Army's 5th and 19th Brigade at Pir Kalewa on 20 October 1948. While deployed there, he faced constant frontal and crossfire from opposition machine guns. He defended his post and imposed significant losses on the Indian Army. The enemy used every means to capture the post with the two companies' attacks and heavy shelling but he still managed to retain his post with just a handful of men.

== Death ==
During the battle, he was critically injured after being hit in the chest by artillery fire but despite this he crawled to collect ammunition from the dead and wounded soldiers to distribute it amongst the remaining surviving soldiers. He was repositioning his surviving troops to defend against another wave of enemy attacks, when he was hit with an artillery shell fatally. He ultimately died on 26 October 1948.

=== Awarded Posthumously ===
On 14 March 1949, the Defence Council of Azad Jammu & Kashmir posthumously adorned him with the Hilal-e-Kashmir and on 30 November 1995 the Government of Pakistan declared his Hilal-e-Kashmir equivalent to Nishan-e-Haider.
