= Mohi-ud-Din Islamic University =

University in Pakistan

- Motto: Intelligence plus character that is the true goal of education
- Type: Private sector university
- Established: 2000
- Founders: Muhammad Alauddin Siddiqui
- Affiliations: Higher Education Commission of Pakistan
- Chancellor: Sultan Ul Arfeen Siddiqui Al Azhari
- Location: Nerian Sharif, Azad Kashmir, Pakistan; 33.7530815°N 73.7711012°E
- Website: Official website

Mohi-ud-Din Islamic University (MIU) is a private university in Nerian Sharif, Azad Kashmir, Pakistan, that offers undergraduate and post-graduate education.

== Recognized university ==
Mohi-ud-Din Islamic University, Nerian Sharif, Azad Kashmir is a chartered university and is recognized by the Higher Education Commission of Pakistan (HEC).

== Degree programs ==
- Bachelor of Business Administration
- Bachelor of Commerce
- BS Biotechnology
- BS Chemistry
- BS Computer Science
- BS English
- BS Islamic Studies
- BS Mathematics
- BS Sports Sciences & Physical Education
- LLB (5 Years)
- M.A English
- M.Phil. Biotechnology
- M.Phil. Botany
- M.Phil. Chemistry
- M.Phil. Education
- M.Sc. Botany
- M.Sc. Chemistry
- M.Sc. Economics
- M.Sc. Mathematics
- MS Computer Science
- MS Management Science
- Ph.D. Mathematics
- MBBS
- Doctor of Pharmacy (PharmD)

== See also ==
- List of institutions of higher education in Azad Kashmir
