= Nishan-e-Haider =

Highest military award of Pakistan

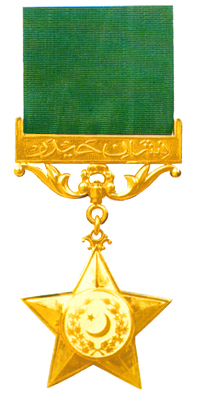
- Obverse of the Nishan-e-Haider
- Native name: نشان حیدر
- Type: Medal
- Awarded for: Acts of greatest heroism in circumstances of extreme danger in the presence of the enemy on land, at sea or in the air.
- Country: Islamic Republic of Pakistan
- Presented by: Government of Pakistan
- Eligibility: Military personnel only
- Post-nominals: NH
- Status: Active
- Established: 16 March 1957 (applied retrospectively from 1948 onwards)
- First award: 16 March 1957 – Indo-Pakistani War of 1947, Captain Muhammad Sarwar, Pakistan army
- Final award: 15 July 1999 – Kargil War, Havildar Lalak Jan, Pakistan army

Highlights
- Total: 11
- Total awarded posthumously: 11
- Website: pakistanarmy.gov.pk
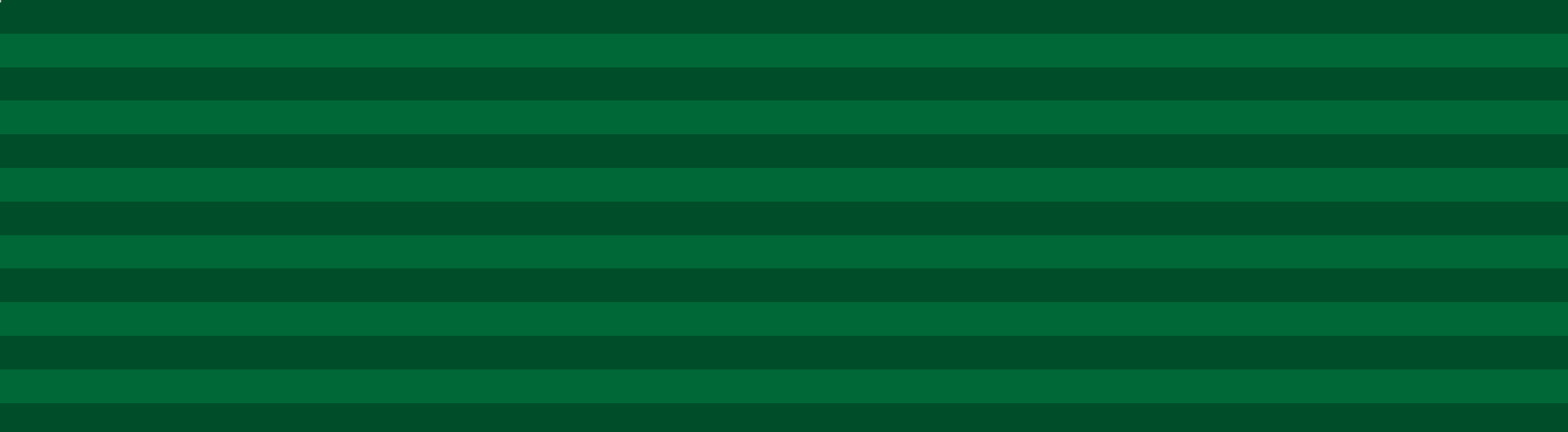
- Service Ribbon of Nishan-e-Haider

Precedence
- Next (higher): None
- Equivalent: Hilal-e-Kashmir

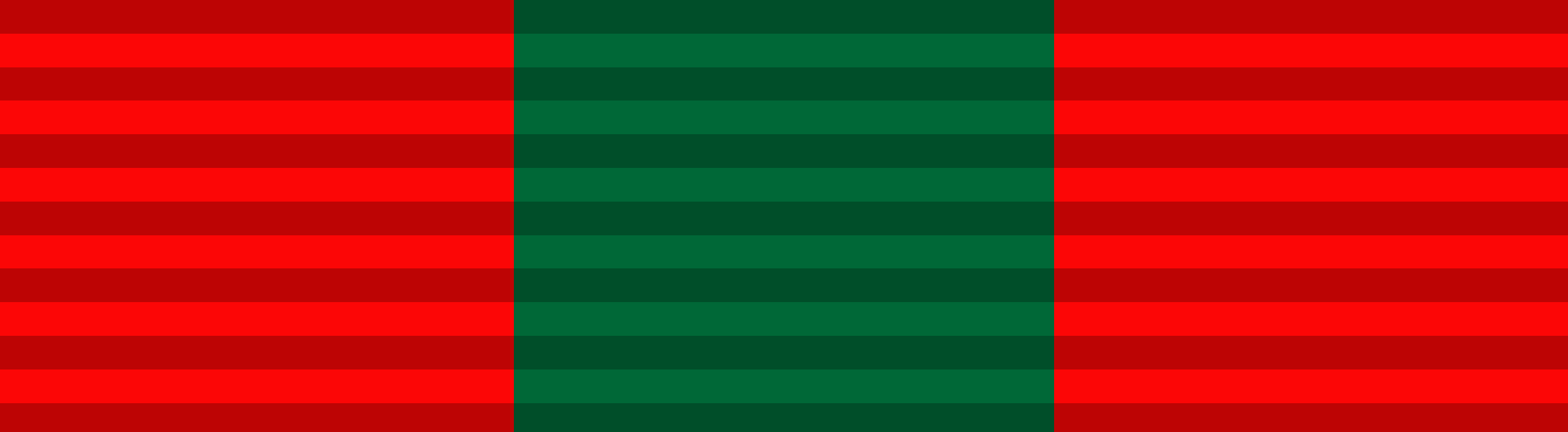
- Next (lower): Hilal-e-Jurat

Nishan-e-Haider (NH; Urdu: نشان حیدر, lit. 'Mark of Haider (Ali RA)' or 'Emblem of the Lion') is the highest military gallantry award of Pakistan. The Nishan-e-Haider is awarded only to members of the Pakistan Armed Forces. It recognises the highest acts of extraordinary bravery in the face of the enemy in air, land, or sea. It has been awarded only 11 times since Pakistan's independence in 1947.

Nishan-e-Haider literally means "Emblem of the Lion" in the Urdu language. The word "Haider" is also the epithet of Ali, who is referred to as the 'Lion of Allah', a valiant warrior and leader. Ali was the fourth Caliph of Islam and was declared by Muhammad as the bravest person. He is known by his courage, bravery and power in Islam.

== History ==
The Nishan-e-Haider was established by the Government of Pakistan and named after Ali on 14 August 1947, the year that Pakistan became an independent state in 1947. Pak became republic under the consttituion of 1956. It was applied retrospectively from the date of Pakistan's independence on 14 August 1947. It is Pakistan's highest award and takes precedence over all military and civil awards. Of the eleven Nishan-e-Haider recipients to date, ten have been from the Army and one from the Air Force.

Although some consider it equivalent to the British Victoria Cross and the United States Medal of Honor, it is unique in that it has so far been awarded only posthumously. At one point in time the Chief of Army Staff of Pakistan was asked why it was only awarded posthumously, his response reportedly that if it is awarded to a living person he may be involved in dishonourable conduct in the future which may disgrace the Award.

== Criterion ==
The Nishan-e-Haider can be awarded to all ranks of the Armed Forces for showing feats of extraordinary courage in confronting the enemy. As a matter of practice and precedent, it has only been awarded where it has been established that the recipient acted despite high risks and was martyred (shaheed) in the act.

== Manufacturing ==
The Nishan-e-Haider is manufactured by Pakistan Mint on the order of the Ministry of Defence. It is forged from captured enemy equipment and consists of 88% copper, 10% gold, and 2% zinc.

== Recipients ==
Recipients
No.	Name of the recipient	Regiment	Rank	Battle	Date of death
1	Raja Muhammad Sarwar	2 Punjab Regiment(Haidri Awal), Pakistan Army	Captain	Indo-Pakistani War of 1947	27 July 1948
2	Saif Ali Janjua	18 Azad Kashmir Regiment, Pakistan Army	Naik	Indo-Pakistani War of 1947	26 October 1948
3	Tufail Mohammad	13 Punjab Regiment, Border Guards East Pakistan Rifles, Pakistan Army	Major	Indo-Pakistani border skirmishes of 1958	7 August 1958
4	Raja Aziz Bhatti	17 Punjab Regiment, Pakistan Army	Major	Indo-Pakistani War of 1965	10 September 1965
5	Rashid Minhas	No. 2 Fighter Conversion Unit, Pakistan Air Force	Pilot Officer	Bangladesh Liberation War	20 August 1971
6	Muhammad Akram	4 Frontier Force Regiment, Pakistan Army	Major	Indo-Pakistani War of 1971	5 December 1971
7	Shabbir Sharif	6 Frontier Force Regiment, Pakistan Army	Major	Indo-Pakistani War of 1971	6 December 1971
8	Muhammad Hussain	20 Lancers, Punjab (Armoured Corps), Pakistan Army	Sowar	Indo-Pakistani War of 1971	10 December 1971
9	Muhammad Mahfuz	15 Punjab Regiment, Pakistan Army	Lance naik	Indo-Pakistani War of 1971	17 December 1971
10	Karnal Sher Khan	12 Northern Light Infantry, Pakistan Army	Captain	Kargil War	5 July 1999
11	Lalak Jan	12 Northern Light Infantry, Pakistan Army	Havildar	Kargil War	7 July 1999

== Legacy ==
Monuments or places named after recipients of Nishan-E-Haider include:

- Captain Raja Muhammad Sarwar Bhatti Shaheed Monument, Sanghori
- Major Raja Aziz Bhatti Shaheed Memorial, Lahore
- Shrine of Major Raja Aziz Bhatti Shaheed, Gujrat
- Rashid Minhas Boulevard, E-9 Islamabad
- Rashid Minhas Road, Gulberg Town Karachi
- Major Akram Shaheed Memorial, Jhelum
- Major Shabbir Sharif Shaheed Monument & Park, DHA Lahore
- Sawar Muhammad Hussain Stadium, Gujar Khan
- Karnal Sher Khan Stadium, Peshawar
- Karnal Sher Khan Cadet College, Swabi
- Karnal Sher Interchange, Mardan
- Lalak Jan Park, Multan
- Karnal Sher Khan Shaheed Road, Islamabad

== See also ==
- Hilal-e-Kashmir
