= Sitara-e-Jurat =

Third-highest military award of Pakistan

Sitara-e-Jurat ستارہِ جرأت
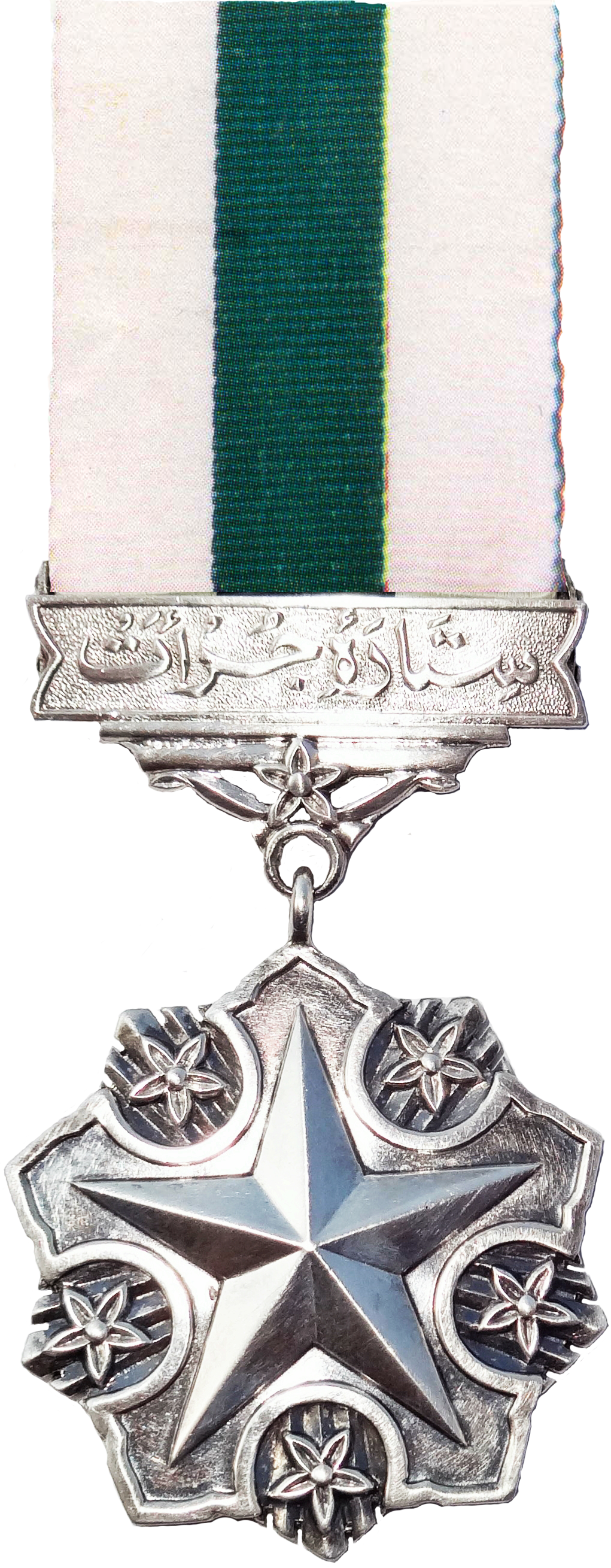
- Type: Military decoration
- Awarded for: "gallant and distinguished service performed in combat"
- Presented by: Government of Pakistan
- Eligibility: Military only. Admissible to all ranks for gallant & distinguished service in combat. Normally awarded to Officers and Junior Commissioned Officers (JCOs)
- Post-nominals: SJ
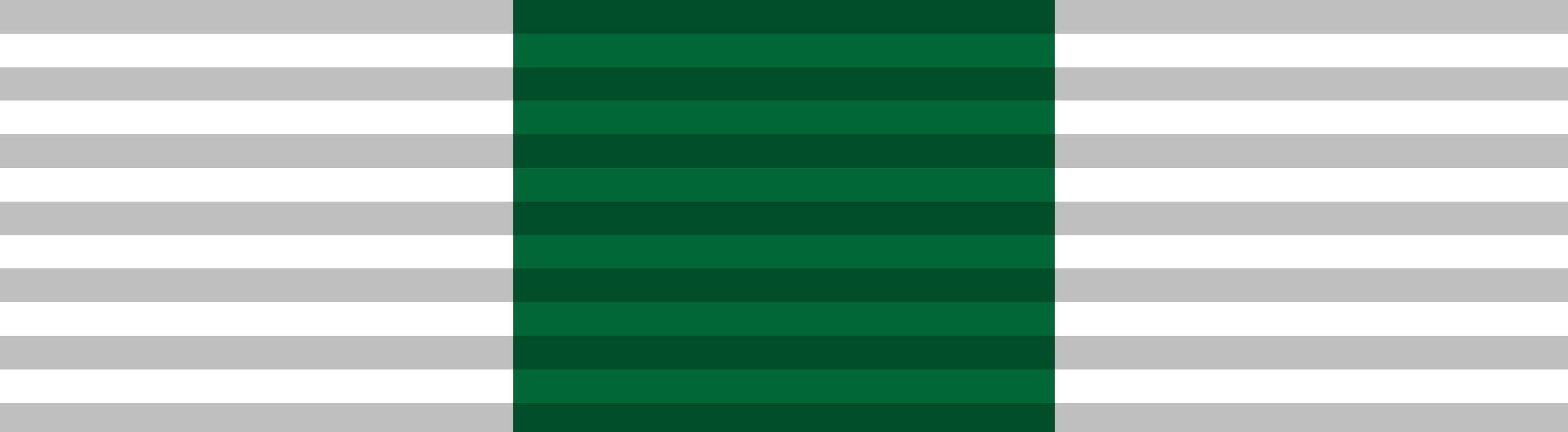
- Ribbon: Sitara-e-Jurat
- Status: Currently awarded
- Established: 16 March 1957
- Final award: Wing Commander Noman Ali Khan

Precedence
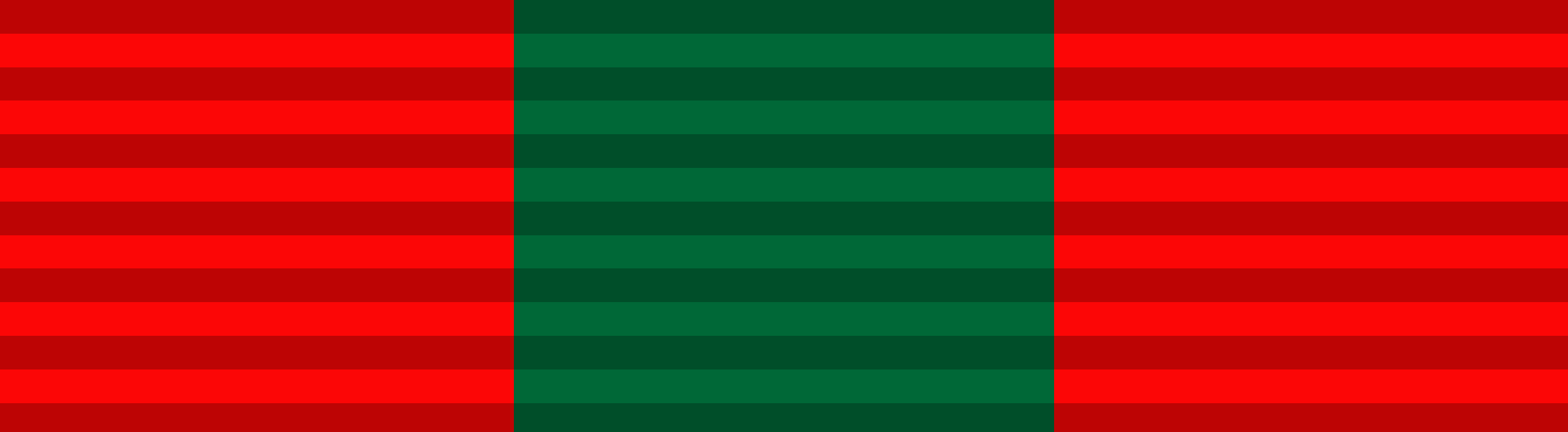
- Next (higher): Hilal-e-Jurat

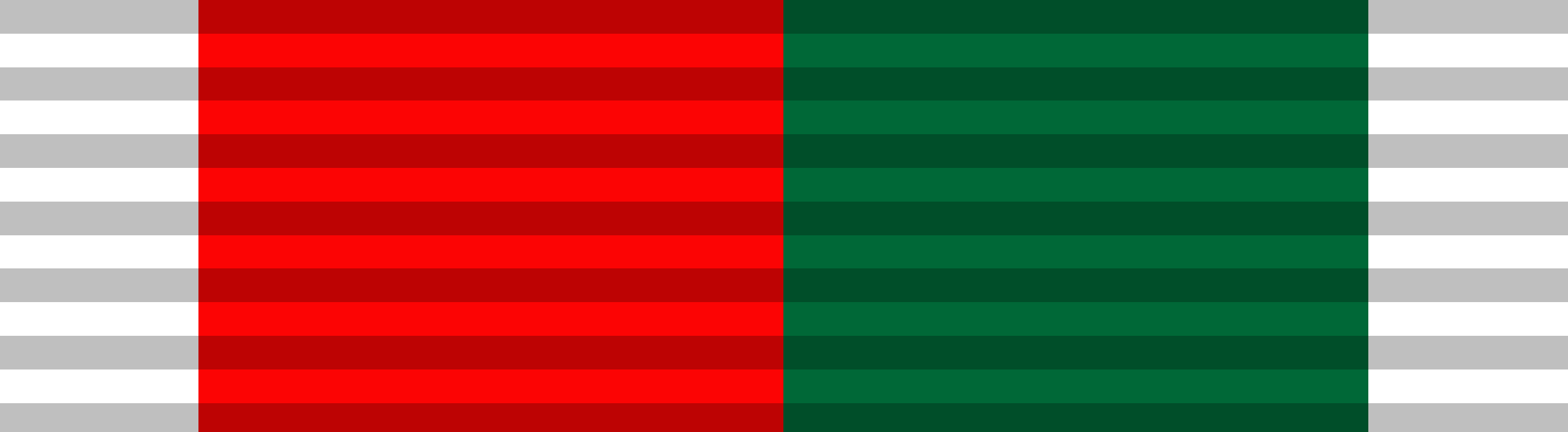
- Next (lower): Tamgha-e-Jurat

Sitara-e-Jurat (Urdu: ستارہِ جرأت, Star of Courage) is the third highest military award of Pakistan. It was established in 1957 after Pakistan became a republic; however, it was instituted retrospectively back to 1947. It is awarded for gallantry or distinguished service in combat; and can be bestowed upon officers, junior commissioned officers, petty officers, warrant officers, soldiers, sailors, airmen, and equivalents in the Pakistan Army, Navy, Air Force, and various paramilitary forces under federal control, such as the Frontier Corps, the Frontier Constabulary, and the Pakistan Rangers. It may be considered to be roughly equivalent to the Military Cross and the Silver Star.

== List of recipients ==
The Sitara-e-Jurat

=== Pakistan Army ===
==== Azad Kashmir Regiment, 1965 ====
- Captain Abdul Jalil Orakzai (Shaheed) 14 AK Regiment at Kalidhar AJK 1965 War

==== Corps of Engineer, 1965 ====
- PA-4117 Lt.Col.(Major in 1965) Malik Aftab Ahmed Khan (SJ) FIRST Recipient of 1965,0045 hours, 7th, Sep. 1965

==== Frontier Force Regiment, 1965 ====
- Major Shabbir Sharif Shaheed (NH, SJ)
- Major Aqil Daad, 1965
- Captain Sher Badshah Mahsud 5 FF Kashmir War 1948
- Major Ziauddin Ahmed Abbasi Shaheed (Received SJ for his fought bravely in Battlefield of Chowinda. Guides Cavalry
- 11 September 1965 PA-2163 Lt Col Muhammad Hayat Khan (4FFR) Zafarwal (12 September 1965)
- Lt. Col. (later Brigadier) Khalid Nazir (40 FFR) Kargil, 1998

==== Punjab Regiment, 1965 ====
- PA-? Lt Col Asghar Ali Raja SJ 3rd Punjab Regiment for leading the surprise attack at Jassar bridge in 1965 against the Indian army.
- PA-83 Major Muhammad Akbar Khan SJ(1948 Kashmir War)
- PA-? Lt Col Muhammad Rafiq SJ
- PA-882 Major General Muhammad Jamshed, MC SJ
- PA-? Brigadier Muhammad Taj, SJ & Bar, 18 Punjab. FATEH MUNABAO
- PA-? Lt Col Tanvir Ahmed Khan SJ, SI(M)
- Lt Gen. M Masood Aslam HI (M) & HI (Civil), SJ
- PA-* Brigadier Abu Rashid, SJ & HI(M)
- PSS-15177 Major Malik Munawar Khan Awan, SJ & Bar, 21 AK Regiment, Commander of only successful Ghaznavi Force of Operation Gibraltar.
- Number-335139 Sepoy Maqbool Hussain, SJ, 4 AK Regiment.
- PA-? Lieutenant Colonel Sahibzad Gul Shaheed
- PA-? Captain Abdul Jalil Orakzai Shaheed 3rd Punjab Regiment at Kalidhar AJK 1965 War
- PA-? Capt Sagheer Hussain Shaheed, SJ. Punjab Regt.
- PA-1525 Lt Col J.F. Golwalla, SJ. 16th Punjab Regt, 1965 War (Dograi)
- PA-7082 2/Lt. Farooq Abdul Aziz Shaheed, SJ. 20th Battalion, Punjab Regiment (20 PR) Haji Pir Sector, date of shahadat 21^{st} September 1965.

==== 6 Lancers, Armed Corps., Khem Karan, 1965 ====
- Major Ziaur Rahman
- Major Mohammad Zia Uddin Uppal Shaheed, SJ, 30 SP (Wagah)
- Abdul Rab Niazi 30 SP Artillery Regiment, Wagah, 1965
  PSS 3682
- Major Saiyid Naseem Haider Rizvi( Shaheed) SJ 14BR Sialkot Sector 1965 war (Recommended for Nishan-e-Haider) 53 Field Artillery, East Pakistan, 1971 PA. Brig Tariq Khalil (then Major) (SJ, IS with Bar, Gallantry), East Pakistan, 1971 Baloch Regiment, 1965 War
- PA-? Capt Hafiz Muhammad Ahmad, SJ- 25th Cavalry
- Major General Mumtaz Ali SJ & Bar
- PA-919 * Brigadier M.Aslam Khan, SJ, Pakistan war hero- Liberation War Gilgit-Baltistan, 1948 29 Cavalry (Armoured Corps)
- 2nd Lieutenant Abdul Mohsin Khalid Kark (Shaheed), 29 Cavalary, Kushtia, East Pakistan (now Bangladesh), 9 December 1971
- Mujahida Hussain Bibi, SJ, 5 AK Regiment (1947- 48 Kashmir War) First Female Sitara-e-Jurat of Pakistan
- Major Mujahid Mirani Shaheed - 26 November Salala 2011
- PSS 15720 Major Mohammad Din SJ 1965 1st AK Regiment Unknown Regiment
- PA- 6368 Major Muhummad Asjad Latif (Ord Depot Qta/2 E BR) (29-3-71 East Pakistan)
- PA- 45622 Capt. Muhammad Umair Butt
- Lt.Col. Muhammad Sher Khan, SJ, 5 AK Regiment (1947- 48 Kashmir War)
- Capt Mehboob Niazi 9 FF (1947- 48 Kashmir War)

==== Indo-Pakistan War of 1971 ====
- Lt. Col. (later Brig.) Mumtaz Malik (SJ)
- Lt. Col. (Later Brig.) Muhammad Taj (SJ)
- Capt. Muhammad Aslam Bajwa (SJ) 49 Fd Regt Arty/53 Fd Regt
- Lt Col (Later Brig.) Saeed Ahmed Khan (SJ)

==== Naval units ====
- Pakistan Navy Submarine Force, contributions to the Indo-Pakistani war of 1965 and 1971.

== Pakistan Navy ==
- PN-643 Commander Zafar Muhammad Khan SJ & HJ, Submarine PNS/M Ghazi
- Vice Admiral (Retd) Irfan Ahmed (SJ & HI-Military) - Indo-Pak War of 1971 (serving as Lieutenant on a PN Gunboat in erstwhile East Pakistan).
- Lieutenant Abdul Qayyum Khan PN
- Admiral Shahid Karimullah - Indo-Pak War of 1971 - (Serving as a CO of a Gunboat during the war in East Pakistan)
- Vice Admiral Ahmad Tasnim - Indo-Pak War of 1965 (Serving as Executive Officer of PNS Ghazi) Indo-Pak War of 1971 (Commander of PNS Hangor (S131))
- Admiral Karamat Rahman Niazi - Indo-Pak War of 1965 (Serving as Commander of PNS Ghazi)
- Capt Mohsin A Khan Baloch SJ PN 1034 Served as CO commila in East Pakistan during 1971 indo Pak war

== Pakistan Air Force ==
- Flight Lieutenant Syed Khalid Hasan Wasti
- Air Cdre Mir Alam Khan SJ 1971
- Yunus Hussain
- Flight Lieutenant Saiful Azam PAF's No. 17 Squadron from PAF Base Sargodha, post 1971-joined BAF
- Muhammad Shafique
- Iftikhar Ahmad Khan Ghory
- Air Commodore Sajad Haider
- Flt Lt (Later Air Marshal) Azim Daudpota
- Sqn Ldr (Later Air Chief Marshal & Chief of Air Staff) Jamal Ahmed Khan
- Wg Cdr (Later Air Chief Marshal & Chief of Air Staff) Anwar Shamim
- Flt Lt (Later Air Chief Marshal & Chief of Air Staff) Hakimullah Khan Durrani
- Flt Lt Saadat Mohammad Akhtar Khan (Indo-Pak War 1965)
- Sqd Ldr Alauddin Ahmed (Indo Pak War 1965)
- Sqd Ldr Muhammad Iqbal (Indo Pak War 1965)
- Sqd Ldr Munir Ahmed (Indo Pak War 1965)
- Sqn Ldr Ghani Akbar
- Masood Ahmed Sikander
- Abdul Samad Ali Changazi
- Syed Saad Akhtar Hatmi
- Muhammad Mahmood Alam
- Wg Cdr Syed Manzoor ul Hassan Hashmi
- Sarfraz Rafiqui
- Imtiaz Bhatti
- Farooq Umar
- Flight Lieutenant Yusuf Ali Khan
- ST Muhammad Hussain Warraich
- Wg Cdr Noman Ali Khan
- Sqn Ldr Rashid Mir
- Cecil Chaudhry
- Squadron Leader Khusro
- Flight Lieutenant Chaudhry Rizwan Ahmed

== See also ==
- Awards and decorations of the Pakistan military
- Pakistani Armed Forces
