= Javed Hassan =

Pakistani army officer

Javed Hassan HI(M) SI(M)
- Alma mater: Pakistan Military Academy
- Military career
- Allegiance: Pakistan
- Branch: Pakistan Army
- Service years: c. 1970 — 2004
- Rank: Lieutenant General
- Commands: Commandant National Defence University Inspector General Northern Light Infantry Commander XXX Corps Gujranwala Defence Attache to USA
- Conflicts: Indo-Pakistani War of 1971; Kargil War; 2001–2002 India–Pakistan standoff
- Awards: Hilal-i-Imtiaz; Sitara-e-Imtiaz
- Other work: Chief Adviser, University of Management and Technology (Lahore)

Javed Hassan is a retired Pakistani three star general, who is currently serving as Chief Adviser of the University of Management and Technology. He was the Force commander of the Northern Areas during the Kargil War

== Military career ==
After completing his education, Hassan had joined the Pakistan Military Academy.

As a major general, Hassan commanded the Force Command Northern Areas. Under his tenure as Commander FCNA, the Kargil war unfolded.

Hassan was actively involved in provoking the war against India. He was present in the meeting of high-profile Pakistani officials, playing the role as a key architect of the Kargil Conflict. Hassan's alleged failed role in the conflict is often criticized by several accounts. Reportedly, Hassan had an offensive attitude towards Indians. Despite showing confidence about the conflict, the operation turned out to be a failure.

After the war, Hassan continued serving in the army. He served as Inspector General of the Northern Light Infantry and Military Attache to USA. Subsequently, his rank was elevated to lieutenant general and was appointed as Corps Commander XXX Corps. He was later forcefully sent to retirement in 2004.

== Post military career ==
Following his retirement, Javed Hassan has been involved in think tanks and academic circles. He is serving as the Chief Adviser of University of Management and Technology. He has contributed to strategic discussions and has emphasized Pakistan’s relations with countries like Turkey. Notably, he participated in establishing the Pak–Turkey Studies Center, aimed at fostering stronger bilateral ties.

== Bibliography ==
- Hassan, Javed (1990). India: A Study in Profile. Quetta: Services Book Club. ISBN 978-969-8125-02-8. A study conducted for the Faculty of Research and Doctrinal Studies, Command and Staff College.
