= Hilal-e-Kashmir =

Highest military award of Azad Kashmir

Hilal-e-Kashmir ہلالِ کشمیر
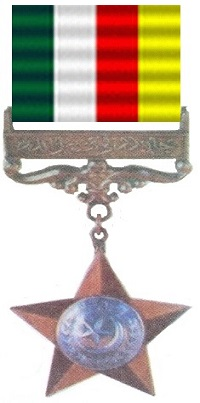
- Type: Azad Jammu and Kashmir military medal with service ribbon (Decoration)
- Awarded for: (Same criteria as of Nishan-e-Haider)
- Presented by: the President of Azad Jammu and Kashmir in the name of the Government of Azad Jammu and Kashmir
- Eligibility: Military personnel only
- Post-nominals: HK
- Status: Currently awarded
- Established: 14 March 1949
- First award: 10 October 1948 – Indo-Pakistani War of 1947, Naik Saif Ali Janjua, Pakistan army
- Final award: (Only one awarded to date)

Highlights
- Total: 1
- Total awarded posthumously: 1
- Ribbon bar of Hilal-e-Kashmir

Precedence
- Next (higher): None
- Equivalent: Nishan-e-Haider
- Next (lower): None

Hilal-e-Kashmir (Urdu: ہلالِ کشمیر; abbreviated as "HK") is the highest military gallantry award of Azad Jammu & Kashmir.

== Recipient ==
1. Naik Saif Ali Janjua (1923–1948)

== See also ==
Nishan-e-Haider
