= Neela Butt =

- Tourist Resort
- Location within Pakistan
- Coordinates: 33.9946°N 73.5853°E
- Country: Pakistan
- State: Azad Kashmir
- District: Bagh
- Elevation: 2,000 m (6,600 ft)

Languages
  - Official: Urdu
- Time zone: PST

Neela Butt is a tourist resort in Bagh District, Azad Kashmir, Pakistan. It is located 31 kilometers (19 mi) from Bagh city and 6 kilometers (3.7 mi) from Dhirkot at the height of 6,600 feet (2,000 m).
