= Ghulam Mohi-ud-Din Ghaznavi =

Islamic Sufi Scholar (1902–1975)

Ghulam Mohiudin Ghaznavi
- Ghulam Mohiudin Ghaznavi Nervi

1st Custodian of Nerian Sharif
- In office Unknown – 11 April 1975
- Preceded by: Position established
- Succeeded by: Muhammad Alauddin Siddiqui
- Official name: Ghulam Mohiudin

Personal life
- Born: 1902 Ghazni, Afghanistan
- Died: 11 April 1975 Nerian Sharif
- Resting place: Nerian Sharif
- Children: 7
- Parent: Mohammad Akbar Khan (father)

Religious life
- Religion: Islam

Muslim leader
- Predecessor: Muhammad Qasim Sadiq
- Successor: Muhammad Alauddin Siddiqui

Ghulam Mohi-ud-Din Ghaznavi (1902–1975, Urdu: پیر غلام محی الدین غزنوی) was a Sufi scholar and first custodian of Nerian Sharif.

He was born in 1902 in Ghazni, Afghanistan. His father's name was Mohammad Akbar Khan. He died on Friday 11 April 1975 after the Jummah prayer. He was 73 years old.

== See also ==
- Alauddin Siddiqui
