= Pakistan Navy Submarine Force =

Underwater warfare division of the Pakistan Navy

Pakistan Navy Submarine Force, officially the PN Submarine Force, is the principal underwater warfare component of the Pakistan Navy. It was established in 1964 with the induction of its first submarine, PNS Ghazi (formerly USS Diablo) from the United States.

== See also ==
- Pakistan Maritime Security Agency
- Pakistan Coast Guards
