= Budhal tehsil =

Coordinates: 22°44′N 78°25′E

Budhal is a tehsil in Rajouri district, Jammu and Kashmir, India. It is named after the village of Budhal, which is located at a distance of 57 KM from District headquarters Rajouri. Budhal Tehsil is bounded by Darhal Tehsil towards west, Thana Mandi Tehsil towards west, Mahore Tehsil towards East, Rajouri towards west. There are 51 villages in Budhal tehsil which is one of the largest tehsil in Rajouri district. Budhal is very beautiful place There are many unexplored lakes on the hill top of Budhal. There is a Degree College in Budhal having Science and Arts streams. GOVT.Degree College Budhal was established in 2008 by the then Government of Jammu and Kashmir INC

== Demographics ==
According to 2011 Census of India, The total population of Budhal, Tehsil is 123,050 living in 14,477 Houses, spread across a total of 51 villages and 51 panchayats, of which are 64,990 males and 58,060 females. Gojri & Pahari are the Local Language. People also speak Urdu, Kashmiri.

== Weather and climate ==
It is comparatively cool in summer. Budhal summer highest day temperature is in between 19 °C to 23 °C. Average temperature in January is 11 °C, February is 13 °C, March is 19 °C, April is 21 °C, May is 23 °C.

== Pin codes ==
185156 (Kangri ), 185233 (Budhal), 185201 (Solki), 185132 (Jawaharnagar (Rajauri) ), 185131 (Rajouri ), 185202 (Kalakot), 185136 (Kotranka)
