= Nerian Sharif =

Town and shrine in Azad Kashmir

- Darbar-e-Alia Nerian Sharif Azad Kashmir
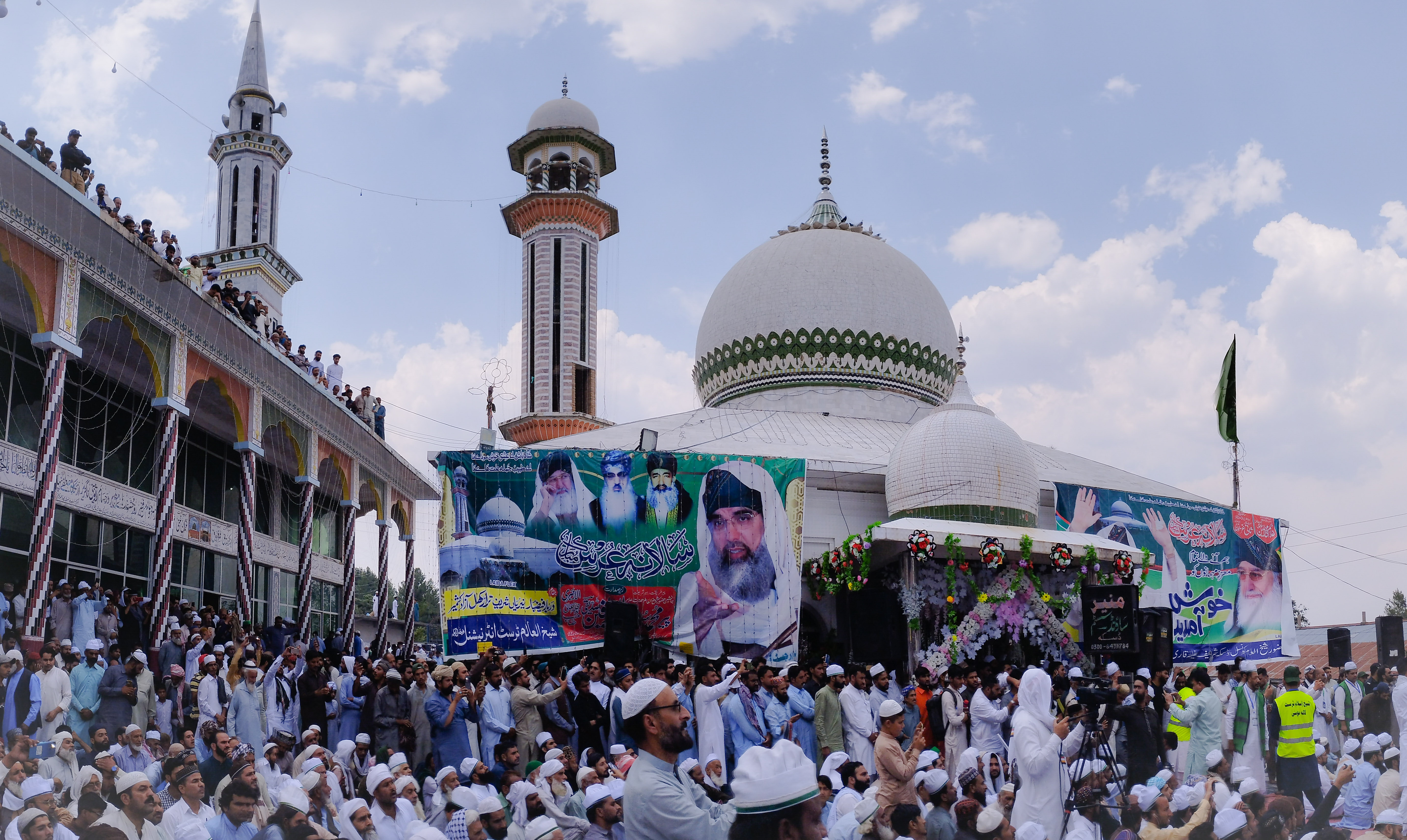

Religion
- Affiliation: Islamic
- Sect: Sunni Islam
- District: Sudhanoti

Location
- Location: Tarar Khel
- State: Azad Kashmir
- Country: Pakistan
- Interactive map of Nerian Sharif

Architecture
- Type: Islamic Architecture

Nerian Sharif is a muslim shrine (dargah) located in the eponymous village, situated in Tarar Khel Tehsil, Sudhanoti District, Azad Kashmir, Pakistan.

== List of Custodians ==
List of Custodians of Nerian Sharif
Custodian	From	To
Ghulam Mohiudin Ghaznavi		1975
Muhammad Alauddin Siddiqui	1975	2017
Sultan Ul Arfeen Siddiqui	2017	Present

=== Ghulam Mohiudin Ghaznavi ===
Ghulam Mohiudin Ghaznavi (1902-1975) was the first custodian of Nerian Sharif.

=== Muhammad Alauddin Siddiqui ===
Muhammad Alauddin Siddiqui (1936-2017) was the second custodian.

=== Sultan Ul Arfeen Siddiqui ===
Sultan Ul Arfeen Siddiqui is the current custodian, taking over in 2017 after the death of Alauddin Siddiqui.

== Shrines ==
The tombs of Khwaja Pir Ghulam Mohiudin Ghaznavi, his younger brother Khwaja Pir Durab known as Sani la Sani Sarkar Ghaznavi, Alauddin Siddiqui (son of Khwaja Ghaznavi) and many more tombs of the family of Nerian Sharif have been buried in Nerian Sharif.

== Location ==
Darbar-e-Alia Nerian Sharif دربار عالیہ نیریاں شریف
- Town and Historical Place
- Location within Azad Kashmir Location within Pakistan
- Coordinates: 33.7516408°N 73.7721151°E
- Country: Pakistan
- Tehsil: Tarar Khel
- District: Sudhanoti
- Time zone: PST
