= Muhammad Alauddin Siddiqui =

Islamic Sufi scholar (1938–2017)

Shaykh Ul Aalam Pir Alauddin Siddiqui
- پِیر مُحَمَّد عَلَاؤالدّین صِدِیقِی
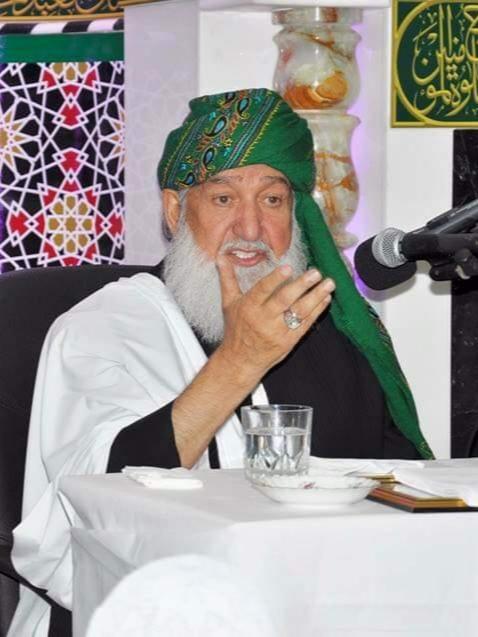

2nd Custodian of Nerian Sharif
- In office 11 April 1975 – 3 February 2017
- Preceded by: Ghulam Mohi-ud-Din Ghaznavi
- Succeeded by: Shaykh Pir Noor Ul Arfeen Siddiqui

1st Chancellor of Mohi-ud-Din Islamic University
- In office 2000 – 3 February 2017
- Preceded by: Position established
- Succeeded by: Sultan Ul Arfeen Siddiqui

1st Chancellor of Mohi-ud-Din Islamic Medical College
- In office 2009 – 3 February 2017
- Preceded by: Position established
- Succeeded by: Sultan Ul Arfeen Siddiqui

President of Jamiat-e-Ulma-e-Ahle Sunnat AJ&K
- In office Un-known – 3 February 2017
- Title: Shaykh Ul Aalam
- Official name: Muhammad Alauddin

Personal life
- Born: 1 January 1936 or 1 January 1938 Nerian Sharif, Azad Kashmir, British India
- Died: 3 February 2017 (aged 79) Birmingham
- Resting place: Nerian Sharif, Azad Kashmir, Pakistan
- Children: Sultan Ul Arfeen Siddiqui; Noor Ul Arfeen Siddiqui
- Parent: Ghulam Mohiudin Ghaznavi Nervi (father)
- Known for: Dars e Masnavi
- Occupation: Preacher, Sufi
- Honors: The 500 Most Influential Muslims (2012–2018)

Religious life
- Religion: Islam
- Denomination: Sunni
- Institute: Mohiudin Islamic University Nerian Sharif; Mohiudin Islamic Medical College Mirpur Azad Kashmir
- Founder of: Mohiuddin Trust; Noor TV
- Tariqa: Naqshbandia Mohrvia Ghanznawia Siddiquia
- Movement: Barelvi

Muslim leader
- Predecessor: Ghulam Mohiudin Ghaznavi Nervi
- Successor: Shaykh Noor Ul Arfeen Siddiqui
- Awards: The Lifetime Achievement Award by the Institute of Peace and Development (INSPAD)

Muhammad Alauddin Siddiqui (Urdu: پیر محمد علاؤالدین صدیقی; 1 January 1938 – 3 February 2017) was an Islamic Sufi scholar and social personality.

He appeared in Islamic educational programmes on ARY Q TV and on NOOR TV. He established madrassas for religious and non religious education, as well as mosques in Pakistan and England. He was the founder of two colleges in the Azad Kashmir region: Mohiudin Islamic Medical College in Mirpur, and Mohiudin Islamic University in Nerian Sharif. He was on the list of 500 Most Influential Muslims seven times from 2012 to 2018.

== Education ==
Alauddin Siddiqui studied Islam under his father, Ghulam Mohi-ud-Din Ghaznavi. Later, he studied Mishkat Sharif and Jalalayn in Jamia Haqqa’iq al Uloom in Hazro. His passion for further studies brought him to Jamia Naeemia Lahore where he completed lessons from Muhammad Hussain Naeemi. After that he came to Wazirabad, where he participated in the Daura e Qur'an with Abdul Ghufar Hazarawi. He next came to Sardar Ahmad Chishti in Faisalabad to complete the teaching of Hadith Mubarakah. Sardar Ahmad Chishti completed the lessons and put on the Dastar-e-Fazilat.

== Protest against Islamophobia ==
Alauddin Siddiqui called for a protest outside Parliament of London on 6 October 2012 to express his outrage at the recent film Innocence of Muslims, which was described as insulting the dignity of the Islamic prophet Muhammad. He appealed to the Muslim Ummah to end their internal differences and unite under the banner of the Prophet of Islam. He spoke on the importance of a united front of the Muslim Ummah against Islamophobia.

On Saturday, October 2012, thousands of Muslims gathered outside the Houses of Parliament in London to express their feelings about the importance of honoring Muhammad. The protest, titled "Alliance of Socialism Anti-Islamophobia Event", was attended by Muslims from all sects of the Islamic community, including speakers from both Sunni and Shia Islam.

== Awards and honors ==
On 10 June 2012, Alauddin Siddiqui was awarded the Lifetime Achievement Award for humanitarian, education and health services by Institute of Peace and Development (INSPAD), an international Non-governmental organization.

Alauddin Siddiqui's name appeared seven times in the list of 500 Most Influential Muslims (from the 3rd edition to the 9th edition. His name appeared in the list of "Preachers and Spiritual leaders" from UK.

The last time his name appeared in the 9th edition (2018) in section "The Obituaries" after his death.

== Death ==
Alauddin Siddiqui died in London on Friday, 3 February 2017 after an illness. He was 79 years old.

== Funeral ==
Two funeral prayers were offered for him, one at Birmingham in Aston Park and the other at Nerian Sharif in Azad Kashmir, Pakistan. His first funeral prayer was held in Birmingham's Aston Park, led by his younger son Noor ul Arfeen Siddiqui. More than 20,000 people attended. His second funeral prayer was held in his home town Nerian Sharif and was led by his older son Sultan Ul Arfeen Siddiqui. More than 50,000 people attended.

Alauddin Siddiqui was buried in Darbar e Aliya Nerian Sharif, Azad Kashmir, Pakistan.

== Reception ==
- Mohammad Karam Shah Sahib al Azhari from Bhera Sharif said on the Urs Mubarak at Nerian Sharif: "Huzoor Shaykh ul Aalam is spreading the Light of Shariah and Tariqa to the Ummah in the most commendable manner, continuing to work for Islam and will always continue to do so." Pir Karam Shah Sahib continued: "Nerian Sharif is such an origin of Light that the candles of knowledge are forever lit, and I foresee that a great university will be established here (referring to Mohiuddin Islamic University)."
- Shah Ahmad Noorani said: "If I could have found one more Huzoor Shaykh ul Alam in Pakistan, I would have changed the face of the country!"
- Qamaruddin Sialwi from Sial Sharif said, at the 1972 Sunni Conference: "The (then) Sahibzada Huzoor Shaykh ul Aalam possesses a glittering Light upon his blessed forehead, and from this we know that Pir Siddiqui, throughout the entire world, will achieve great things for Islam."
- Sayyid Naseeruddin Naseer al Jilani from Golra Sharif said on Noor TV: "What Huzoor Shaykh ul Aalam have started with the work of Noor TV is no small accomplishment. I have declared to the Ulama of the Ahlus Sunnah that this is our shining hope: Noor TV. What else is there? This is a feat no Pir or Mawlana had achieved before. It is no small matter that tens of thousands of people are receiving the message of Allah's religion [through this channel]. May Allah accept Huzoor Shaykh ul Aalam's both religious and social work."
- Muhammad Imdad Hussain (Jamia Al Karam, Britain) from Jhang said: "High is his ambition, so charming His speech, so beautiful his soul, That is all he needs for the journey, he who leads the Caravan!"

== See also ==
- Pir Ghulam Mohiudin Ghaznavi
- Nerian Sharif
