= Amjad Ali Chaudhri =

Pakistani Brigadier

Brigadier Amjad Ali Chaudhri HJ
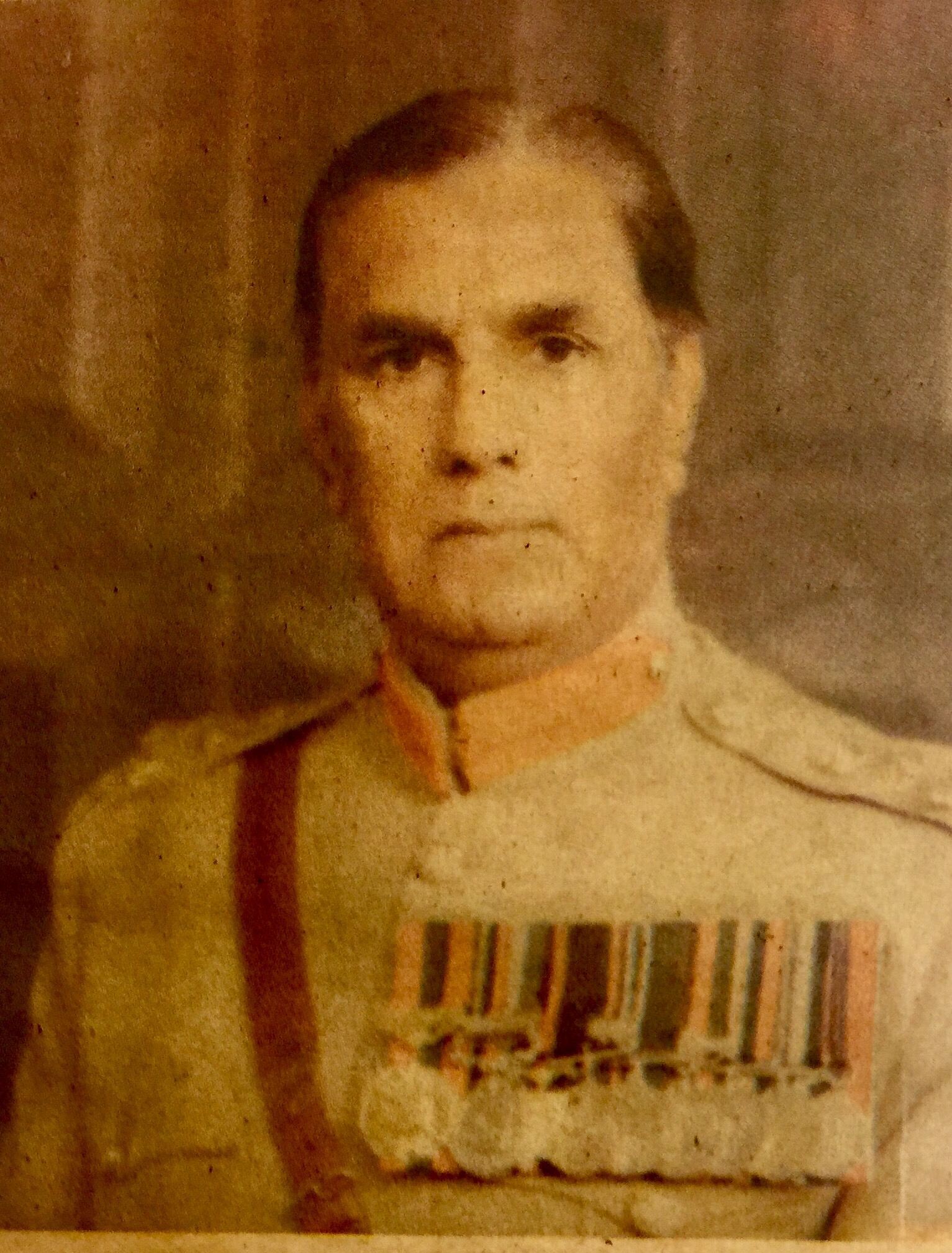
- Born: 9 January 1917; Poonch, Kashmir, British India
- Died: 5 December 1990(73 age); Lahore, Punjab, Pakistan
- Military career
- Allegiance: British India (1942–47); Pakistan (1947–?)
- Branch: (British Raj) British Indian Army; Pakistan Army
- Rank: Brigadier
- Unit: IV Corps
- Known for: His Service during the Battle of Chawinda
- Conflicts: Second World War; Indo-Pakistani War of 1947–1948; Indo-Pakistani War of 1965
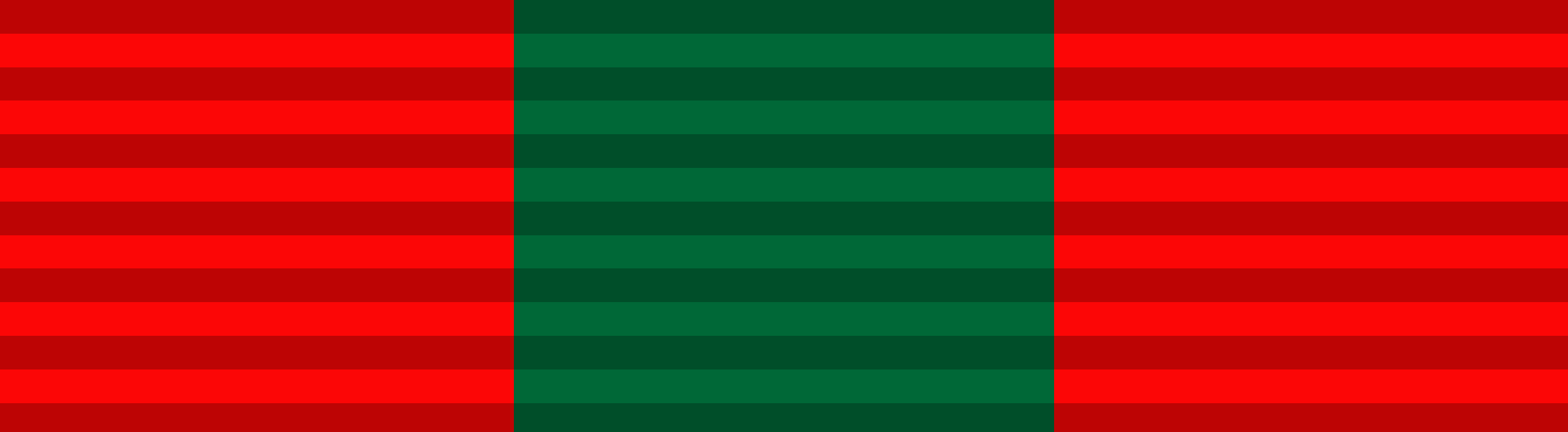
- Awards: Hilal-e-Jurat

Brigadier Amjad Ali Khan Chaudhry HJ (9 January 1917 Poonch – 5 December 1990 Lahore) was a Pakistani military officer who fought in the Indo-Pakistani War of 1965. He was decorated for his service during the Battle of Chawinda.

== Early life ==
Chaudhry was born in Poonch, Kashmir on 9 January 1917, where his father, Sher Ali Khan was on tour with his family. Due to his academic achievements, he was scholarship holder throughout his school and college career. Chaudhry did his BA (Honours) in English from the Government College, Lahore . (The Nation, "The Gunner at Chawinda", Lahore, 6 December 1991).

Chaudhry was commissioned in the then British Indian Army in 1942 in the 25 Mountain regiment. In 1949, after the Partition of India, he served as second-in-command of the 2 Field Regiment, Royal Pakistan Artillery 1949-50. Chaudhry was Brigade Major (BM)7 Division Artillery during the Kashmir Operations 1947-49.

Chaudhry commanded the 4 Field Regiment Pakistan Artillery from 1956–57 and raised the 26 Field Regiment Artillery in 1957-59. He was Instructor (1954–55) and then Chief Instructor (1966–67) at the Command and Staff College, Quetta earning him the nickname "thinking colonel". Chaudhry also served as Director Weapons and Equipment (DWE) at the General Headquarters (GHQ) 1959-61 of the Pakistan Army in Rawalpindi.

He was Commander 7 Division Artillery 1961-64 and Commander 4 Corps Artillery 1964-66.

== Role of 4 Corps Artillery in the 1965 Indo-Pak War ==
Chaudhry commanded the 4 Corps Artillery in the Kashmir Operations that preceded the 1965 war. When the war started, his unit participated in the battle of Chamb and the battle of Jaurain during Pakistan's thrust into Kashmir. The unit also participated in the battle of Chawinda in the Sialkot sector in Pakistan.

Field Marshal Mohammad Ayub Khan, President of Pakistan during the 1965 War wrote the following tribute on the performance of 4 Corps Artillery:

By all accounts the part played by the 4 Corps Artillery can only be termed as magnificent. The results they achieved are miraculous for which they deserve congratulations and gratitude of us all.
(Signed)
Field Marshal Mohammad Ayub Khan
President of Pakistan
13 November 1965

According to Shuja Nawaz in his history of the Pakistan Army,

"A bold and meticulous artillery plan for the attack (on Chamb) was devised by the energetic leader of the corps artillery Brig. Amjad Ali Khan Chaudhry and his staff .. to dominate the battlefield" (Nawaz, 2008, Crossed Swords, Oxford University Press, p. 224.

According to Lt. Gen. (Retd.) Mahmud Ahmed, who wrote in what is acknowledged as the most detailed and authentic account drawing heavily on official sources of the 1965 War,

"The enemy's attack on Chawinda ... broke up mostly under Artillery fire. Artillery was used most aggressively ... .In no other theatre of the Indo-Pak War of 1965 did the guns come so close to being overrun by Indian tanks so many times, nor were the Pakistani gunners more brilliant in their hour of crisis" (Ahmed, 2006, History of the Indo-Pak War-1965, Oxford University Press, p. 518).

Writing also on the battle of Chawinda the armour corps officer and historian Major (Retd.) Agha Humayun Amin wrote,

"4 Corps Artillery Brigade, led by Brigadier Amjad Chaudhry, described by many contemporaries as one of the finest artillery officers that the sub-continent produced played a crucial role in the Battle of Chawinda" (Amin, Agha Humayun, Maj. (Retd.), March 2001, "Battle of Chawinda", Defence Journal, Karachi

== Battle Honours ==
- Kashmir Operations 1948-49
- Operation Gibraltar Kashmir August 1965
- Battle of Chamb (1965), 1–2 September 1965
- Battle of Jaurian, 4–5 September 1965
- Defense of Sialkot, 8–10 September 1965
- Battle of Chawinda, 11–23 September 1965

== Awards and decorations ==
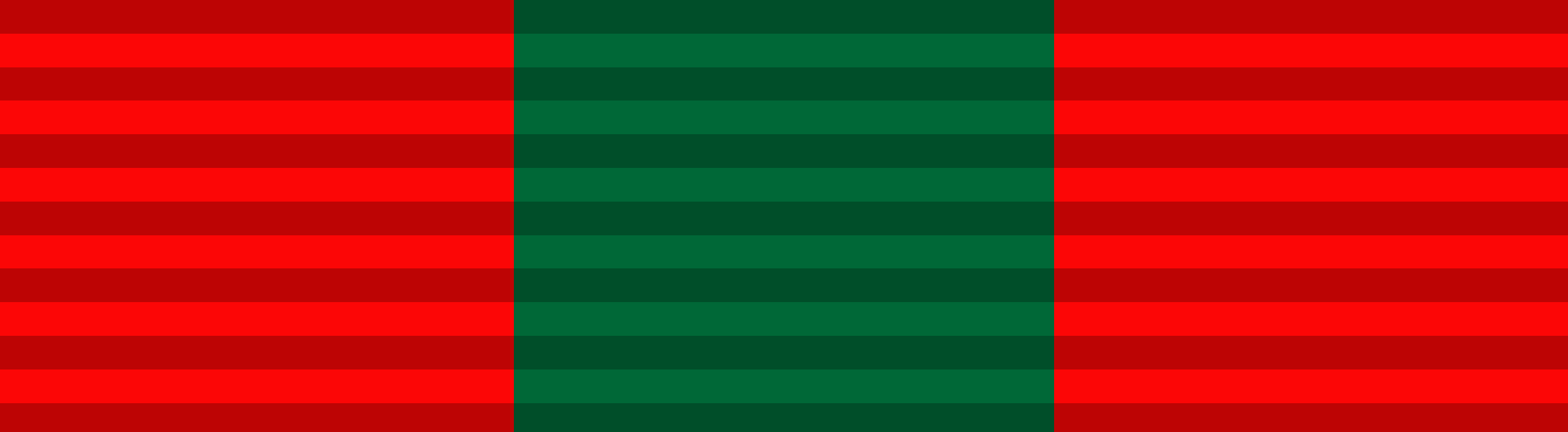

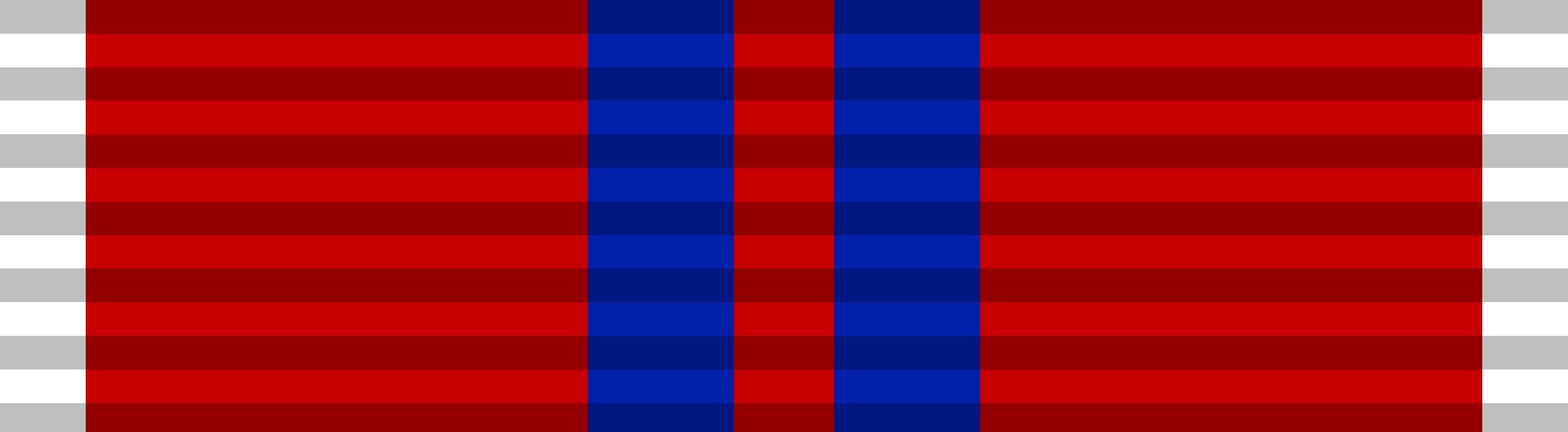

	Hilal-e-Jurat (Crescent of Courage) 1965 War		
Tamgha-e-Diffa (General Service Medal) 1965 War Clasp	Sitara-e-Harb 1965 War (War Star 1965)	Tamgha-e-Jang 1965 War (War Medal 1965)	Pakistan Tamgha (Pakistan Medal) 1947
Tamgha-e-Jamhuria (Republic Commemoration Medal) 1956	War Medal 1939–1945	India Service Medal 1939–1945	Queen Elizabeth II Coronation Medal (1953)

=== Foreign decorations ===
Foreign Awards
UK	War Medal 1939–1945
UK	India Service Medal 1939–1945
UK	Queen Elizabeth II Coronation Medal

== Hilal-i-Jurat Citation ==
- Hilal-i-Jurat during course of the Battle of Chawinda. The citation read:

During the Divisional operation in Chawinda sector the Corps of Artillery did a magnificent job in effectively supporting his formation. It was mainly due to the effective artillery support that determined attacks by superior enemy forces were beaten off with heavy losses to the enemy. It was purely due to the personal example, fine leadership qualities and devotion to duty of Brigadier Amjad Ali Khan Chaudhry that not only the enemy attacks were beaten off but the whole formation got inspiration for a fight to the bitter end. For this conspicuous act to duty and gallantry he has been awarded the highly deserved gallantry decoration of Hilal-i-Jurat. (Chaudhry, 2015, September '65, Ferozsons, Lahore, p.152)
