= Abdul Qayum Sher =

Pakistani Army officer and War Hero

Brigadier Abdul Qayum Sher HJ
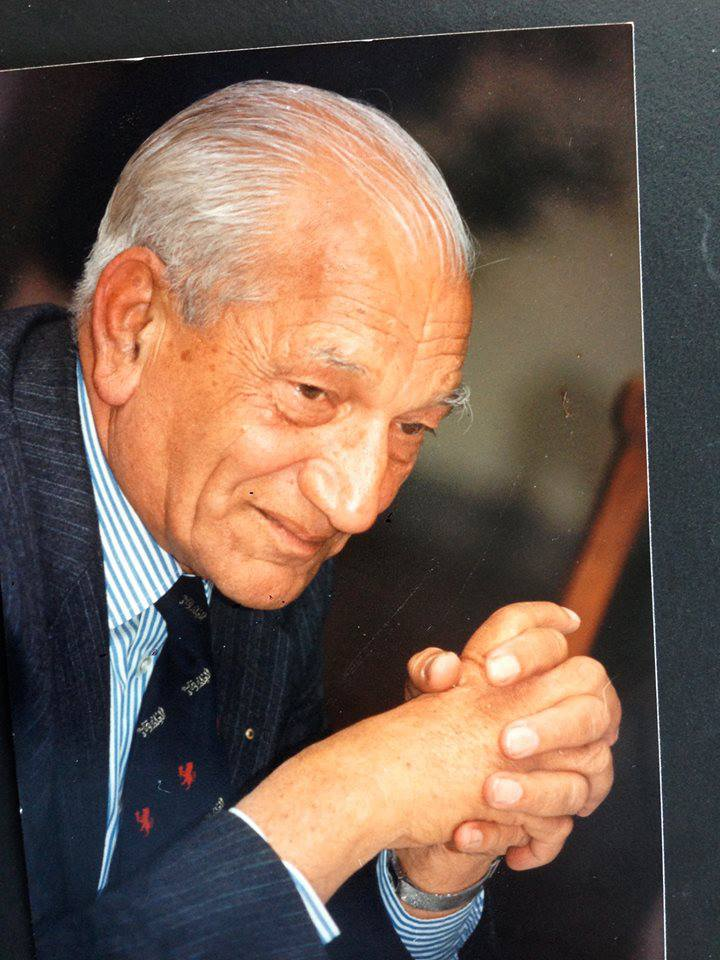
- Born: 15 May 1919; Jangal Khel, Kohat, NWFP, British India (now Khyber Pakhtunkhwa, Pakistan)
- Died: 26 August 2013 (aged 94); Lahore, Punjab, Pakistan
- Spouse: Amita Sher
- Military career
- Allegiance: (British Raj) British India (1940–1947); Pakistan (1947–1968)
- Branch: (British Raj) British Indian Army; Pakistan Army
- Service years: 1940–1968
- Rank: Brigadier
- Service number: PA-332
- Unit: Baluch Regiment
- Commands: 11 Baluch; Guides Infantry, 22 Brigade
- Conflicts: World War II: Burma Campaign; Indo-Pakistani War of 1965
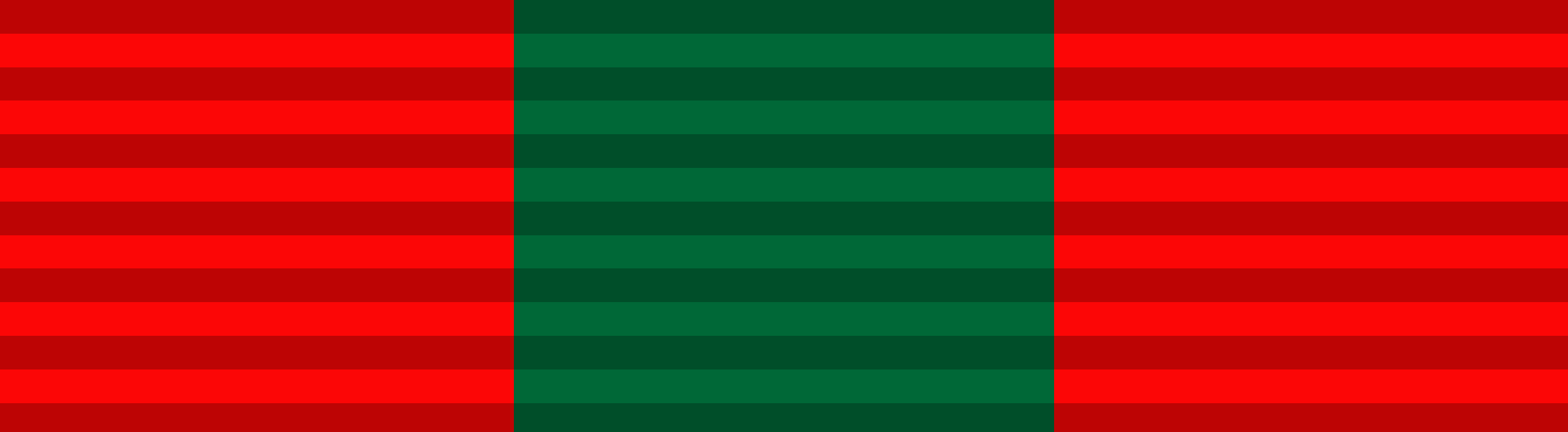
- Awards: Hilal-e-Jurat

Abdul Qayum Sher HJ (15 May 1919 – 26 August 2013) was an officer of the Pakistani Army and a War Hero of the 1965 Indo-Pakistani War.

== Early life and education ==
Abdul Qayum Sher was born into the prominent Shinwari tribe of Pashtuns, in Jungle Khel Kohat in the then North West Frontier Province. His father Khan Mohammed Azam Khan was an engineer with the Indian Civil Service, who became Permanent Secretary in the Department of Public Works after the Partition of India and who remained Chairman WAPDA East Pakistan.

As a child, Abdul Qayum Sher was sent first to Switzerland and then on to Durham in England, where he attended Durham School (1935–38) and then Durham College. He participated in sports and was active in the rowing and rugby teams at school level.

== Military career ==
Abdul Qayum Sher was on a visit to India at the outbreak of World War II, and enrolled into the British Indian Army, attending the Indian Military Academy at Dehradun. He served with distinction in the Burma campaign during the war.

At partition he chose to live in Pakistan, and participated in the capture of Pandu, Kashmir, during hostilities in 1948 with India. He commanded various battalions including his parent 11 Baluch Regiment. He attended the Pakistan Command and Staff College in Quetta and in the Indo-Pakistani War of 1965 was Brigade Commander 22 Brigade on the Lahore front. He led the counterattack force which repelled the Indian attack on Lahore, and captured Indian General N. Prasad's command headquarters (15th Indian Division), leading the attack with his Brigadier insignia and flag on his command jeep. He was awarded the Hilal-i-Jurat for outstanding bravery.

== Personal life ==
In 1945, Abdul Qayum Sher met and married his wife Amita, who was a teacher in Lahore, and later became a social worker and author. They had five children, three of whom are still alive.

After retirement he volunteered for the Pakistan Society for the Rehabilitation of the Disabled (PSRD), and worked there until weeks before his death in 2013.

== Awards and decorations ==
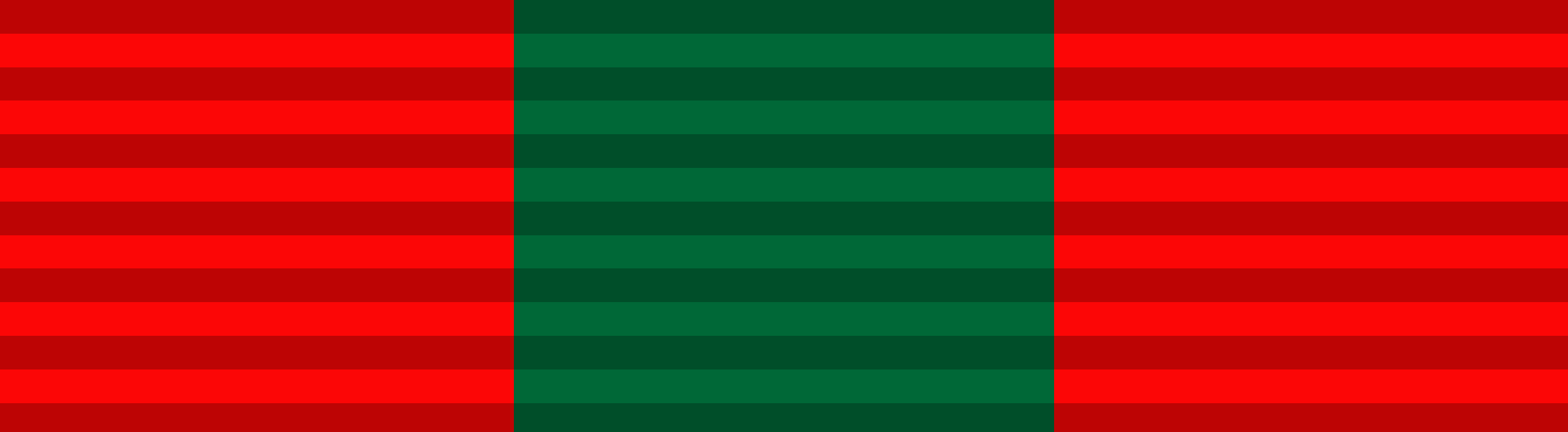

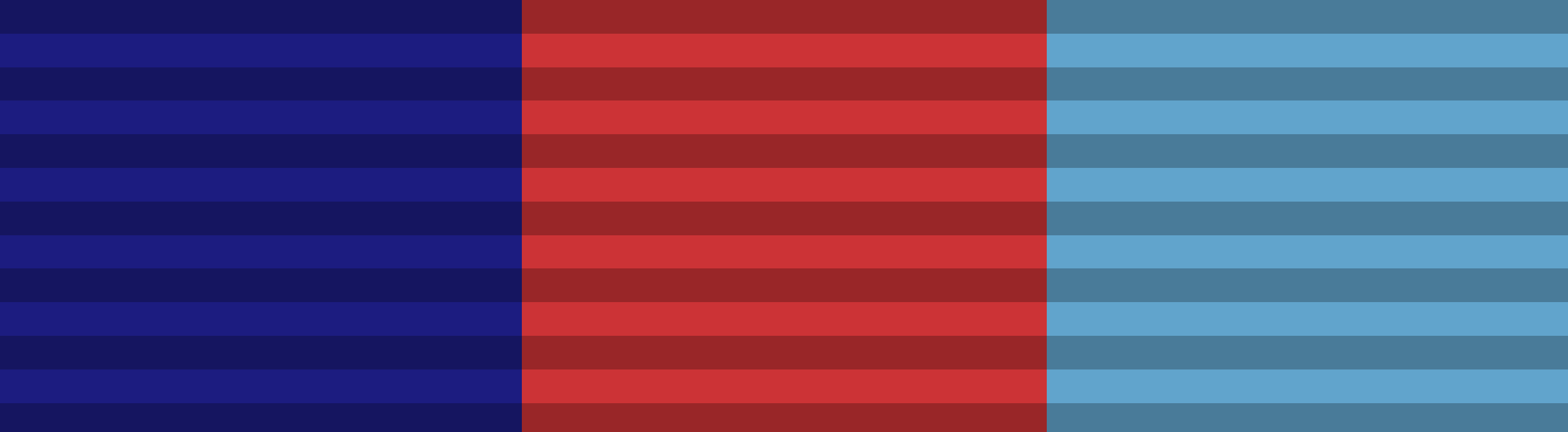

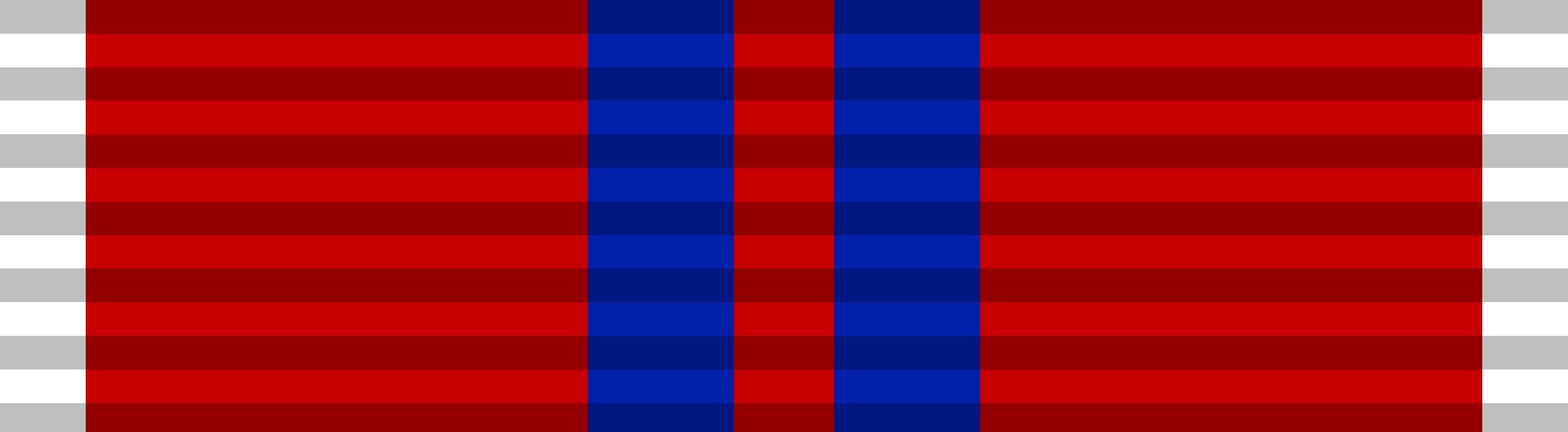

Hilal-e-Jurat (Crescent of Courage) 1965 War	Tamgha-e-Diffa (General Service Medal) 1965 War Clasp		Sitara-e-Harb 1965 War (War Star 1965)
Tamgha-e-Jang 1965 War (War Medal 1965)	Pakistan Tamgha (Pakistan Medal) 1947	Tamgha-e-Jamhuria (Republic Commemoration Medal) 1956	1939-1945 Star
Burma Star	War Medal 1939-1945	India Service Medal 1939–1945	Queen Elizabeth II Coronation Medal (1953)

=== Foreign Decorations ===
Foreign Awards
UK	1939-1945 Star
UK	Burma Star
UK	War Medal 1939-1945
UK	India Service Medal 1939–1945
UK	Queen Elizabeth II Coronation Medal
