= Aslam =

Aslam is a male given name of Arabic origin. Notable people with the name include:

== Given name ==
- Aslam Kader (1962–2025), Indian jockey
- Aslam Khan (disambiguation)
- Mohammad Aslam Khan Khalil (born 1950), American scientist
- Aslam Pahalwan (1927–1989), Pakistani professional wrestler
- Aslam Rana, Canadian politician

== Surname ==
- Sheikh Mohammad Aslam (born 1958), Bangladeshi footballer
- Dilpazier Aslam (born 1978), English journalist
- Mohammad Aslam (disambiguation)
