= Azad Kashmir Regular Force =

Defunct Pakistani paramilitary unit

- Active: 1947–1972
- Allegiance: Azad Kashmir; Pakistan
- Type: Infantry
- Size: 35 Battalion sized regiments
- Headquarters: Muzaffarabad, Azad Kashmir, Pakistan
- Mottos: Arabic: الله أكبر "God is the Greatest"
- Engagements: See list: Indo-Pakistani Wars and Conflicts; Kashmir Conflict (1947–present); First Kashmir War (1947–1949); Second Kashmir War (1965); Bangladesh Liberation War (1971)

Commanders
- Notable commanders: Lt. Gen. Akhtar Hussain Malik; Maj. Malik M. K. Awan; Maj. Muhammad Din

The Azad Kashmir Regular Force (AKRF), formerly known as the Kashmir Liberation Forces (KLF), were the irregular forces of Azad Kashmir commanded by the Pakistan Army. After the end of the First Kashmir War in 1949, they were taken over by the government of Pakistan and converted into a regular force. In this form, the unit became part of the country's paramilitary forces, operating out of the nominally self-governing territory of Azad Jammu and Kashmir. The AKRF was altered from a functioning paramilitary force and merged into the Pakistan Army as the Azad Kashmir Regiment, an infantry regiment, following the Indo-Pakistani War of 1971.

A majority of the Pakistani troops who were deployed to infiltrate the Indian-administered state of Jammu and Kashmir during Operation Gibraltar in August 1965 were in service with the AKRF. Its failure led to the Indo-Pakistani War of 1965. (Note: Also known as the "Second Kashmir War".)

== Name ==
Sardar Ibrahim Khan, the president of the Azad Kashmir provisional government in 1947–1948, called the force Azad Army, which was the term adopted by Christopher Snedden. Other names used were Azad forces, Azad militias and Azad irregulars.

Within Pakistan, they were called the Kashmir Liberation Forces during the course of the First Kashmir War. Sources state that they were "redesignated" as the Azad Kashmir Regular Forces, but do not specify the date.

The most likely date of the redesignation is near the end of 1948, when the Pakistan government is said to have taken command of the Azad Forces. Pakistan also reorganized the forces into "32 battalions of serious military potential ready to take over the position of the Pakistan Army [in the Kashmir territory]. The conversion of the irregulars into regular forces was the key stumbling block to the resolution of the Kashmir dispute.

== History ==
=== Azad Army ===
The 'Azad Army', so called by the Azad Kashmir provisional government, was made up of the former soldiers of the British Indian Army from the regions that later became Azad Kashmir (mostly Poonch, but some also from Mirpur and Muzaffarabad). They were originally recruited for the British Indian Army during the World War II by Khan Muhammad Khan of Bagh, who served as the recruitment officer for the British war effort. Christopher Snedden estimates that 50,000 youth joined the Army during the war, calling themselves "Punjabi Musalmans" and serving in the Punjab Regiment(s). Demobilised after the war, they returned to their home districts, where they grew increasingly dissatisfied with the living conditions. During and after the Partition of India, the All-India Muslim League working from across the border and the local Muslim Conference, which was allied to the Muslim League, channeled their disaffection into a call for accession to Pakistan. Sardar Ibrahim Khan, the Muslim Conference MLA from Bagh, and Sardar Abdul Qayyum Khan, a local zamindar and himself a World War veteran, were the key leaders.

Key locations in Azad Kashmir and vicinity

Sardar Ibrahim escaped to West Pakistan towards the end of August 1947 and established a base for the rebellion in Murree. By 12 September, he also got the Pakistan government into supporting their effort, providing arms and military leadership. A military headquarters called GHQ Azad was established in Gujrat staffed by former Indian National Army officers living in Pakistan, which provided higher military direction to the rebels that made up the 'Azad Army'.

Military operations started on 6 October 1947. Jammu and Kashmir State Forces, which were thinly stretched along the border, withdrew to their garrisons in towns (Poonch, Kotli, Mirpur and Bhimber) and the Azad forces took control of the border areas. The rebels now outnumbered the State Forces (of about 9,000 men) many times over. While this was ongoing, Pakistan launched a tribal invasion of Kashmir on 22 October, via Muzaffarabad, which initiated the First Kashmir War. The Maharaja of Jammu and Kashmir acceded to India in return for military support, and India air-lifted troops for the defence of the Kashmir Valley. From this point onwards, the Azad forces, Pashtun tribes, and other interested militias from Pakistan fought the Jammu and Kashmir State Forces and the Indian Army, till a ceasefire was called at the end of December 1948. The regular Pakistan Army also participated in some of the key battles and supported the rebels from the rear.

=== Kashmir War 1947–48 ===
What began as a revolt by young rebels and ex-servicemen turned out to be a big setback for the tripartite alliance of Maharaja of Jammu and Kashmir, the Indian Government, and the remnants of outgoing British colonial authorities still in control of India and in partial control of Pakistan. To quote the words of the Pakistan Army's Official Portal "They liberated over 34,000 square miles of the State's territory that is now called Azad Jammu and Kashmir and Northern Areas."

AKRF began its struggle as Armed Militia known as Lashkar, Ghazis, and Jathas. As the volunteers swelled the ranks and files, a command structure was established to control this paramilitary force of vigilantes. Being well aware of the aspirations of the people of the State, the Pakistani Government under the leadership of Governor-General M A Jinnah and Prime Minister Liaquat Ali Khan decided to support the Lashkars. British C in C of its Army, General Frank Messervy refused to obey the instructions of M A Jinnah. However, AKRF took Muzaffarabad by 13 October 1947, Mirpur by 25 November 1947, and Jhangar in December 1947. India meanwhile managed to get the Instrument of accession signed by the Hindu Maharaja of state and landed its Military forces in the valley using massive airlifts. Fierce fighting continued for over a year but AKRF with the assistance of Pakistani tribals and the regular army managed to capture the Districts of Mirpur, Bhimber, Kotli, Bagh, Rawlakot, Muzaffarabad and Neelum. The regiment sustained during this war a total of 2633 casualties, distributed on all ranks of the regiment. Naik Saif Ali Janjua of 18th Battalion of Azad Kashmir Regiment (Al Saif) was awarded Hilal-e-Kashmir at Mendhar sector of Jammu. He was commanding a platoon at Pir Kalewa feature and died on 25 Oct 1948 during the battle of Pir Kalewa which was attacked by the 5th Infantry Brigade of the Indian Army.

=== Indo-Pak War 1965 ===
In wartime operations, the AKRF was part of the Order of Battle of the Pakistan Army, in which it was involved in the 1965 Operation Gibraltar. All of the AKRF battalions were part of the 12th Infantry Division (Pakistan) that carried out Operation Gibraltar as well as defended Azad Kashmir. Subedar (later Honorary Captain) Muhammad Israel Khan of 39th AK Regt was then part of the Ghazi Battalion. He was awarded second Sitara E Jurat for his bravery. He had previously won an SJ in 1948 during the Battle of Paran Hill at the foothills of Pir Badesar in 1948. During the same operation one of the Company Commanders of the 21st Azad Kashmir Regiment, Major Malik Munawar Khan Awan, became famous for his heroic action and occupation of the Indian Garrison of Rajauri while commanding Ghaznavi Force during Operation Gibraltar. Later Major Munawar was awarded "Sitara e Jurat" for gallantry and the title of "King of Rajouri" by President Field Marshal Muhammad Ayub Khan.

=== Indo-Pak War 1971 and subsequent operations in Kashmir ===
The Azad Kashmir Regular Forces fought in the 1971 war and then in 1972 when the 9th Azad Kashmir Battalion defended Chakpatra and Leepa Valley against a larger Indian force composed of several regular battalions. This particular battalion was first led in 1948 by Lt Colonel Ghulam Rasul Raja-Sitara-e-Jurrat (1948), Military Cross (WWII). During the Battle of Leepa Valley the 9th AK Battalion with 25 Mountain Regiment Artillery distinguished itself under the leadership of Lt Colonel Haq Nawaz Kyani, SJ and Bar, who died leading the battalion from the front. The Company Commander of B Coy called for artillery fire upon their own position while being overrun by the enemy; in doing this they repulsed the enemy attack.

== Merger into the Pakistan Army ==
Originally considered a paramilitary force, the Azad Kashmir formally became an infantry regiment of the Pakistan Army in 1972 and was renamed the Azad Kashmir Regiment

== Famous members ==
- Malik Munawar Khan Awan
- Russell K. Haight Jr.

== See also ==
- Azad Kashmir Regiment
- Operation Gibraltar
- Ghaznavi Force

== Bibliography ==
- History of the Azad Kashmir Regiment, Vol. I, Mansar: Regimental History Cell, 1997
- Amin, Agha Humayun (April 2000), "The 1947-48 Kashmir War: The war of lost opportunities, Part I", Pakistan Defence Journal, archived from the original on 1 November 2020
- Das Gupta, Jyoti Bhusan (2012) [first published 1968], Jammu and Kashmir, Springer, ISBN 978-94-011-9231-6
- Kiss, Peter Almos (2013), The First Indo-Pakistani War, 1947-48, academia.edu
- Korbel, Josef (1966) [first published 1954], Danger in Kashmir (second ed.), Princeton University Press, ISBN 9781400875238
- Mirza, M. Abdul Haq (1991). The Withering Chinar. Institute of Policy Studies. ISBN 978-969-448-008-4.
- Snedden, Christopher (2012), The Untold Story of the People of Azad Kashmir, Hurst, ISBN 9781849041508
- Snedden, Christopher (2015), Understanding Kashmir and Kashmiris, Oxford University Press, ISBN 978-1-84904-342-7
- Suharwardy, Abdul Haq (1983), Tragedy in Kashmir, Wajidalis
- Zaheer, Hasan (1998), The Times and Trial of the Rawalpindi Conspiracy, 1951: The First Coup Attempt in Pakistan, Oxford University Press, ISBN 978-0-19-577892-2
