= Ghulam Hussain Chaudry =

Pakistani Army officer (1926-1971)

Lieutenant Colonel Ghulam Hussain Chaudhry HJ
- غلام حسین چوہدری
- Portrait, c. 1970

Commanding officer 3rd Punjab Regiment
- In office June 1970 – 4 December 1971

Personal details
- Born: 4 February 1926 Bhalwal Tehsil, Sargodha District, British India
- Died: 4 December 1971 (aged 45)
- Education: Government Islamia College, Lahore; Pakistan Military Academy
- Awards: Hilal-i-Jurat

Military service
- Branch/service: British Indian Army (1946-1947); Pakistan Army (1947-1971)
- Years of service: 1946-1971
- Rank: Lieutenant Colonel
- Unit: British Indian Armoured Corps; 3rd Punjab Regiment
- Battles/wars: Indo-Pakistani War of 1971

Lieutenant Colonel Ghulam Hussain Chaudhry (Note: Urdu: غلام حسین چوہدری) (4 February 1926 – 4 December 1971) was a Pakistan Army officer who was the Commanding Officer of the 3rd Punjab Regiment from June 1970 until he was killed in action in the India-Pakistan War of 1971 while leading his battalion in an assault on Indian bunkers. He was posthumously awarded the second highest award for gallantry, the Hilal-i-Jurat.

== Early life ==
Ghulam Hussain Chaudry was born in the village of Lalliani, Bhalwal Tehsil, Sargodha District on 4 February 1926. His mother died when he was 7 months old and he was raised by his father, Chaudhry Hafiz Abdul Aziz.

He passed his matriculation examination in 1943 in the First Division and subsequently received admission to the Government Islamia College, completing his Faculty of Sciences in 1945. Fond of sports, he was a member of the college hockey team and other sports teams.

== Service years ==
=== British Indian Army ===
He joined the Armoured Corps as a Sepoy, a non-commissioned officer of the British Indian Army, in 1946.

=== Pakistan Army ===
After the Partition of British India in August 1947, Chaudry transferred his service to the Pakistan Army.

In 1950, he applied to join the Pakistan Army as a commissioned officer and was selected for the 3rd Course of the Joint Services Pre-Cadet Training School in Quetta. Subsequently, he joined the 6th Long Course of the Pakistan Military Academy and was commissioned into the Pakistan Army in 1952, joining the 3rd Parachute Battalion of the 1st Punjab Regiment.

He completed a Technical Staff Course from England in 1962. He studied the Russian language in the Soviet Union as part of a foreign language course from 1968 to 1970. He returned to the battalion in March 1970 and was appointed as its second-in-command.

In June 1970, he was promoted to the rank of Lieutenant Colonel and was given the command of 3 Punjab Regiment.

Retired Colonel Azam Qadri described him as a "simple, honest, and upright officer," who "possessed loads of moral courage," and "could withstand hardships" and "never submitted to odds."
