= Aslam Khan =

Aslam Khan may refer to:

- Aslam Khan (cricketer) (1935–1980), Indian cricketer
- Aslam Khan (Pakistani brigadier) (1918–1994), Pakistani military officer in the First Kashmir War
- Aslam Khan (police officer) (1967–2014), Pakistani police officer
- Aslam Sher Khan (born 1953), Indian hockey player
- Aslam Khan (firefighter), who died during the 1967 Hong Kong riots while attempting to defuse a bomb
- Aslam Khan, fictional character in the 2005 Indian film Rang De Basanti
- Aslam Khan, fictional character in the Indian Baahubali franchise

== See also ==
- Mohammad Aslam Khan (disambiguation)
- Muhammad Aslam Khan (1923–1994), Pakistani army officer
- Uzma Aslam Khan (born 1969), Pakistani writer
