= Akhtar Hussain Malik =

Pakistani general (1910-1969)

Major General Akhtar Hussain Malik HJ SPk
- اختر حسین ملک
- Portrait of Malik as a Major General
- Born: c. 1910s Pindori, Punjab, British India (Present day-Pakistan)
- Died: 22 August 1969; Ankara, Turkey
- Cause of death: Car Crash
- Education: Indian Military Academy
- Relatives: Lt. Gen. Abdul Ali Malik (brother)
- Military career
- Allegiance: British India (1941-1947); Pakistan (1947-1969)
- Branch: British Indian Army; Pakistan Army
- Service years: 1941–1969
- Rank: Major General
- Units: 7th Battalion, 16th Punjab Regiment
- Commands: 12th Infantry Division
- Conflicts: Second World War; Indo-Pakistani War of 1947; Indo-Pakistani War of 1965; Operation Gibraltar; Operation Grand Slam; Battle of Chumb (1965)
- Awards: Hilal-e-Jurat; Sitara-e-Pakistan

Akhtar Hussain Malik HJ SPk (1910s – 22 August 1969) was a Pakistani senior military officer, and a widely decorated war hero of the Pakistan Army due to his leadership and command during the Indo-Pakistani War of 1965, and before the 1965 war – Operation Gibraltar and Operation Grand Slam.

== Early years ==
Akhtar Hussain Malik was born in the small village of Pindori, Attock District, British India (present-day Punjab, Pakistan). He was the son of Malik Ghulam Nabi, the headmaster at a local school. Due to the scarcity of good educational institutions in the vicinity of his village at the time, his father made an effort to send him to a school miles away, because of which he and his friends would have to walk for hours every day. By the time he graduated from college, World War II had already broken out and Malik enlisted as a sepoy in the British Indian Army. His personal discipline, educational level and intelligence were soon noticed by the higher command and he was sent to the Indian Military Academy in Dehradun for officer training and additional education. Malik graduated and was commissioned as a Second Lieutenant in the special list on 1 June 1941.

He was admitted to the British Indian Army's newly raised 7th Battalion in the 16th Punjab Regiment. Shortly afterwards, Malik rose through the ranks and was promoted to the rank of First Lieutenant during his time in 7/16th. He was later put to serve in an advisory capacity and appointed as the Brigade Intelligence Officer for the 114th Indian Infantry Brigade on 1 January 1942, and was subsequently promoted to the rank of Captain on 1 April 1942.

He would later go on to serve with his battalion in Burma and Malaya against the Imperial Japanese Armed Forces and supporting Axis powers; and by the end of the war in September 1945, was commanding "A" Company, 7/16th Punjab Regiment in Malaya as a temporary advisory Major.

Upon his return to India after the war, Malik continued his service in the British Indian Army as an officer. Over the next two years, the Indian independence movement against British colonial rule swelled, and by August 1947 had ultimately led to the partitioning of British India into two separate states: the Hindu-majority Dominion of India and the Muslim-majority Dominion of Pakistan. After partition, Malik's regiment was allocated to the newly created Pakistan Army. He opted for Pakistani citizenship, and relocated across the new border shortly afterwards, transferring and continuing his military service with the Pakistan Army.

== Personality ==
Mailk was known amongst his peers for his boldness in strategy, quick thinking, and patriotism. Although he was highly admired and respected by his subordinates, he would often be very outspoken towards them. As a tactician, he planned Operation Gibraltar and Operation Grand Slam under the auspices of the President of Pakistan: Field Marshal Ayub Khan.

== Indo-Pakistani War of 1965 ==
According to BBC News:

"Operation Gibraltar was based on the assumption that guerilla attacks would trigger an uprising by the Muslim majority population of Indian-controlled Kashmir, most of whom had wanted to join Pakistan at the time of the partition of British India in 1947".

As GOC for the 12th Infantry Division, Malik was the overall commander for Operation Grand Slam in the Second Kashmir War. For his successful handling of the initial phase of the operation - in particular the great victory at the Battle of Chumb - he was awarded the Hilal-i-Jur'at, the second highest gallantry award of the Pakistan Army.

Controversially, the command was unilaterally handed over to then Major General Yahya Khan mid-operation, resulting in extensive delays, which were uncalled for, and eventual failure of the operation. The undisclosed reasons for this midway switch has made the operation an object of much speculation in Pakistan Army. In a letter to his brother, Lt. Gen. Abdul Ali Malik, Akhtar Malik bitterly highlighted the sudden change of command and inept leadership of General Yahya Khan as one of the main causes of failure.

=== No clear war winners ===
Again, per BBC News, this war was inconclusive, with no clear winners:

"Over the years, both sides have claimed victory. Pakistan celebrates on 6 September every year as "Defence of Pakistan Day" with a 21-gun salute and a victory parade. Indians meanwhile believe that their forces had the clear upper hand in the war".

== Legacy ==
Qudrat Ullah Shahab, an eminent Urdu writer and civil servant had also commented on the matter, saying:

"At a time when (Major) General Akhtar Hussain Malik was to take over Akhnoor to pave the way to take Srinagar, the capital of Kashmir, he was wrongly removed from the command, and General Yahya Khan was put in his position. Perhaps the aim was to deprive Pakistan success in Akhnoor, Yahya Khan accomplished this task very well."

Zulfikar Ali Bhutto, the ninth Prime Minister and fourth President had also commented on Ayub and Yahya's intervention in the war, saying:

"Had General Akhtar Malik not been stopped in the Chamb-Jaurian Sector, the Indian forces in Kashmir would have suffered serious reverses, but Ayub Khan wanted to make his favorite, General Yahya Khan, a hero."

== Death ==
After the war, Malik was posted to an advisory commanding position for CENTO in Ankara, Turkey, where he succumbed to injuries sustained in a road accident on 22 August 1969. His body was brought back to Pakistan and being an Ahmadi , he was buried in a dedicated cemetery in Rabwah.

== Awards and decorations ==
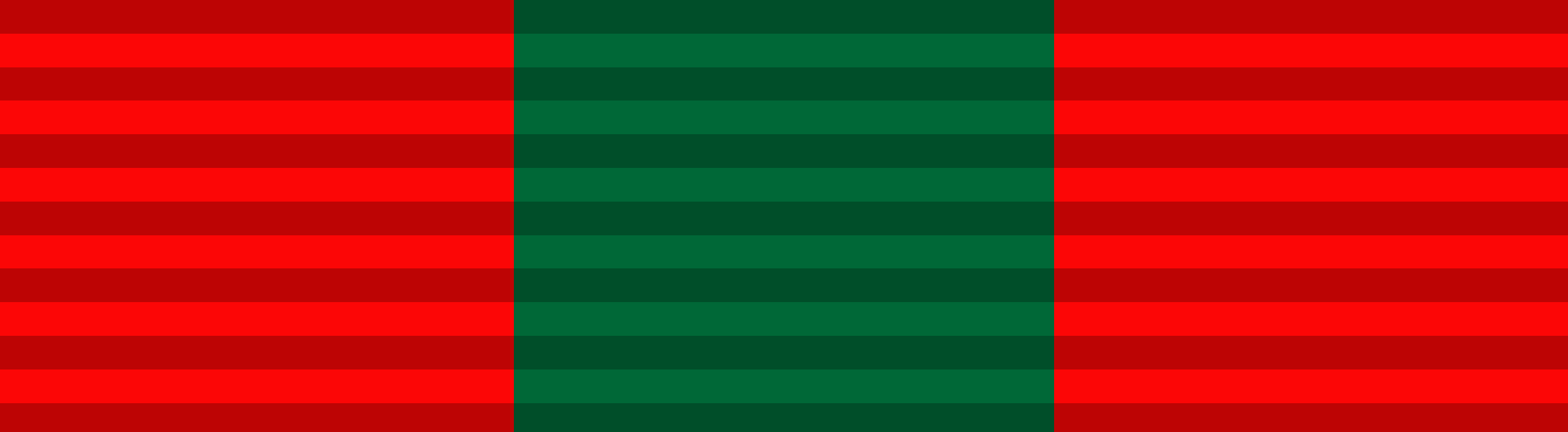

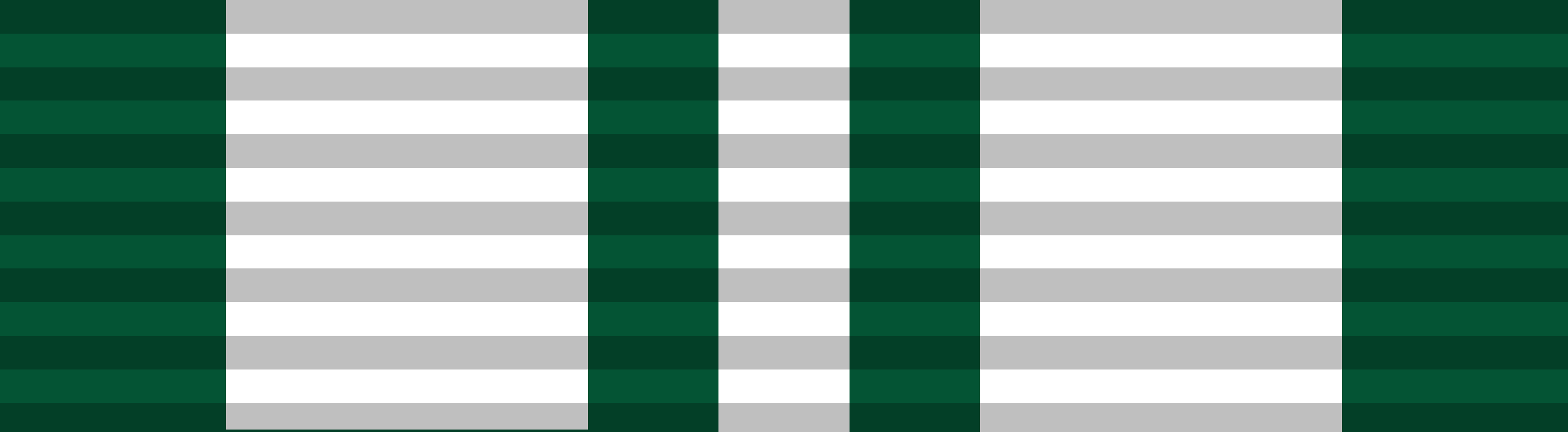

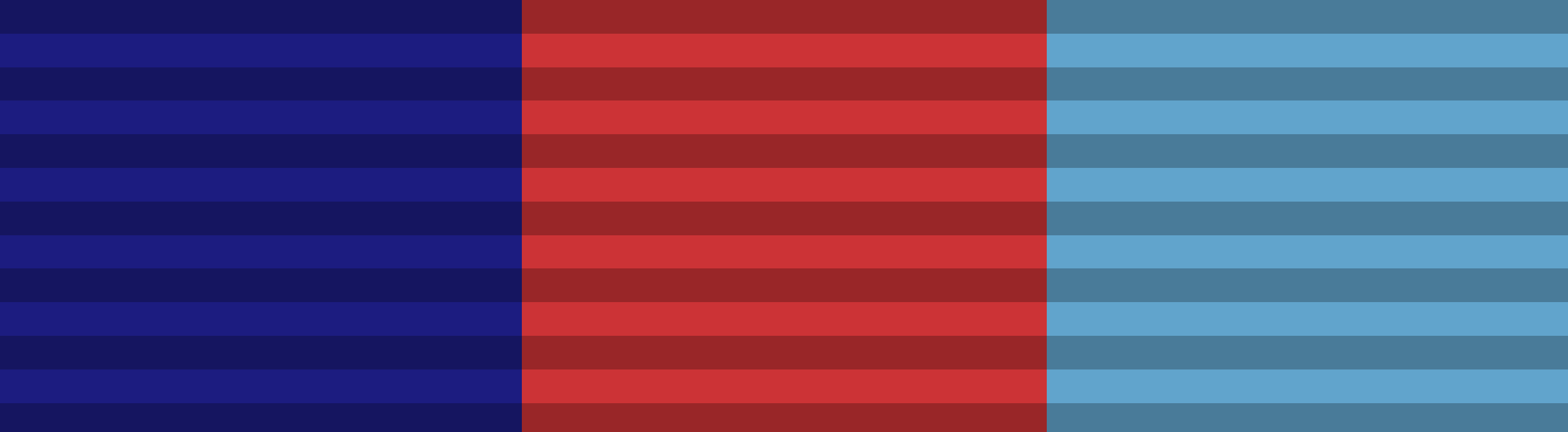

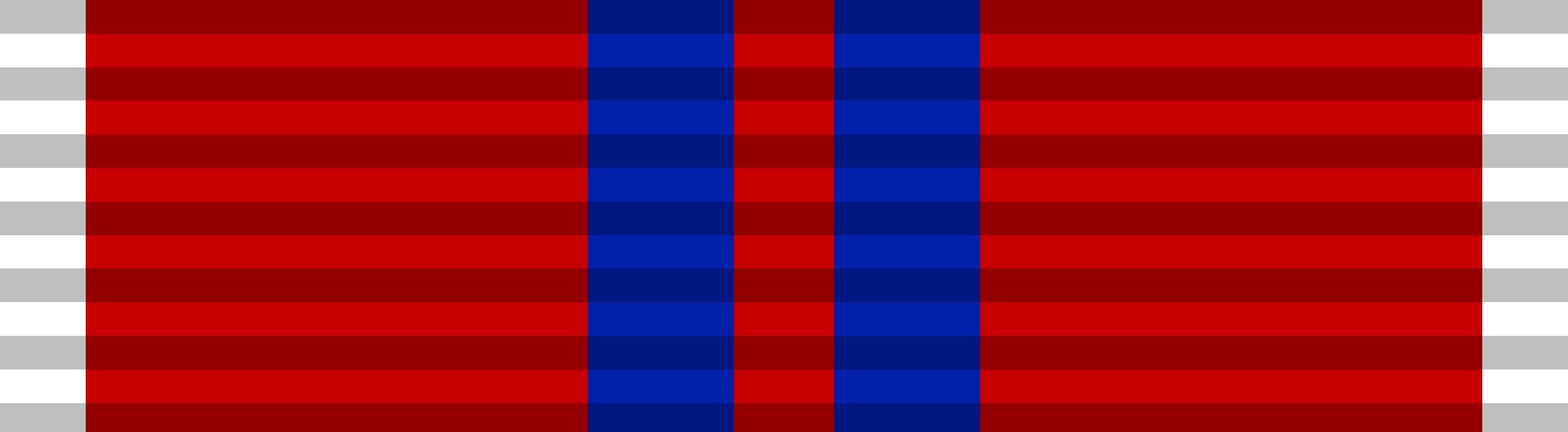

Hilal-e-Jurat (Crescent of Courage) 1965 War	Sitara-e-Pakistan (Star of Pakistan) (SPk)	Tamgha-e-Diffa (General Service Medal) 1965 War Clasp	Sitara-e-Harb 1965 War (War Star 1965)
Tamgha-e-Jang 1965 War (War Medal 1965)	Pakistan Tamgha (Pakistan Medal) 1947	Tamgha-e-Jamhuria (Republic Commemoration Medal) 1956	1939-1945 Star
Burma Star	War Medal 1939–1945	India Service Medal 1939–1945	Queen Elizabeth II Coronation Medal (1953)

=== Foreign decorations ===
Foreign Awards
UK	1939-1945 Star
UK	Burma Star
UK	War Medal 1939–1945
UK	India Service Medal 1939–1945
UK	Queen Elizabeth II Coronation Medal
