= Saadullah Khan =

Saadullah Khan may refer to:

- Saadullah Khan (Mughal Empire), 17th-century Mughal prime minister
- Saadullah Khan of Rohilkhand, 18th-century Nawab of Rohilkhand
- Saadullah Khan (footballer), Pakistani footballer
- Saadullah Khan (officer), Pakistani Army Officer
