= Islamia College =

Islamia College may refer to:

== India ==
- Islamia College of Science and Commerce, Srinagar, Jammu and Kashmir
- Amiruddaula Islamia Degree College, an educational institution in Lucknow
- Maulana Azad College, originally Islamia College, Kolkata

== Pakistan ==
- Islamia College University, Peshawar

== See also ==
- Government Islamia College (disambiguation)
