= Mohammad Aslam Khan =

Mohammad Aslam Khan may refer to:

- Mohammad Aslam Khan (Pakistan Peoples Party politician) (1937–1997), member of the upper house of parliament of Pakistan
- Mohammad Aslam Khan (Pakistan Tehreek-e-Insaf politician), member of the National Assembly of Pakistan

== See also ==
- Muhammad Aslam Khan (1923–1994), Pakistan Army general
