= Russell K. Haight Jr. =

American soldier (1922–2006)

Russell King Haight Jr.
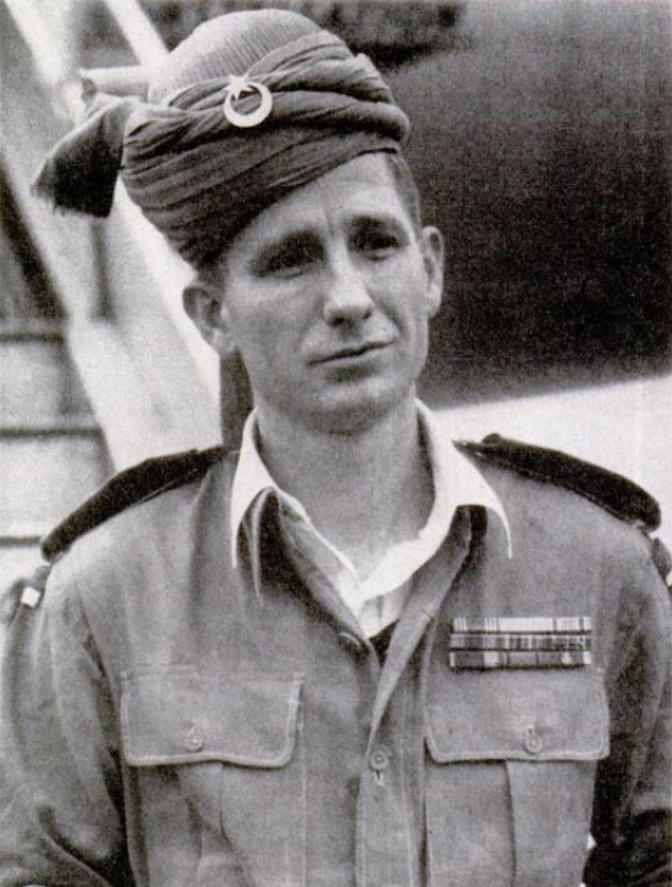
- Haight as a Brigadier in the Azad Army.
- Born: January 25, 1922; Mount Kisco, New York, United States
- Died: May 13, 2006 (aged 84); Norman, Oklahoma, United States
- Burial place: Arlington National Cemetery
- Military career
- Allegiance: Canada; United States; Azad Kashmir
- Branch: Canadian Army; British Army; United States Army; United States Air Force; Azad Kashmir Regular Force
- Service years: 1939—1967
- Rank: Sergeant major Brigadier (Azad Army)
- Unit: Royal Canadian Artillery
- Commands: Kashmir Liberation Forces
- Conflicts: World War II; Indo-Pakistani War of 1947; Korean War; Vietnam War
- Awards: Purple Heart Bronze Star

Russell King Haight Jr. was an American G.I. who served in three armies in multiple engagements during World War II and other wars. He is best known for his role as a prominent commander of the pro-Pakistani rebel forces during the first Kashmir War, in which he held the rank of brigadier.

Haight was the highest ranking foreign officer on the ground in Kashmir. His testimony about Pakistan's involvement in the hostilities was cited in the United Nations debates on the Kashmir dispute.

== Early and personal life ==
Haight was born on 25 January 1922 in Mount Kisco, New York. At the age of 17, he joined the Canadian Army and was stationed in England, where he had married an English woman, Doris Wright of West Hartlepool, in 1943.

== Military career ==
=== World War II ===
Haight served in three armies during World War II. In 1939, a month before receiving his high school diploma, Haight crossed into Canada to enlist. Using the alias "Robert Harris" and claiming to be 19 years old from Winnipeg, he joined the First Survey Regiment, Royal Canadian Artillery based in Montreal.

He then switched to the British Army and saw extensive action across Europe. He was evacuated from the French coast three days after the Battle of Dunkirk evacuation, participated in the commando raid on Sark in the Channel Islands, and fought in Belgium. From September 1940 to May 1941, he served on a bomb disposal squad in London during the Blitz.

He participated in the commando raid on Dieppe, where he was badly wounded. Finally, he joined the American Army after the US joined the war. He was discharged from the army in July 1945.

=== Post war ===
After the war, in December 1946, Haight went to the Kingdom of Afghanistan and worked as a surveyor for the American construction company Morrison–Knudsen which was engaged in building roads there. After surviving a fall from a cliff, he left the job and underwent medical treatment in Rawalpindi, Pakistan, and was intending to head back to the US with various stops in Pakistan and India along the way.

=== Kashmir War ===
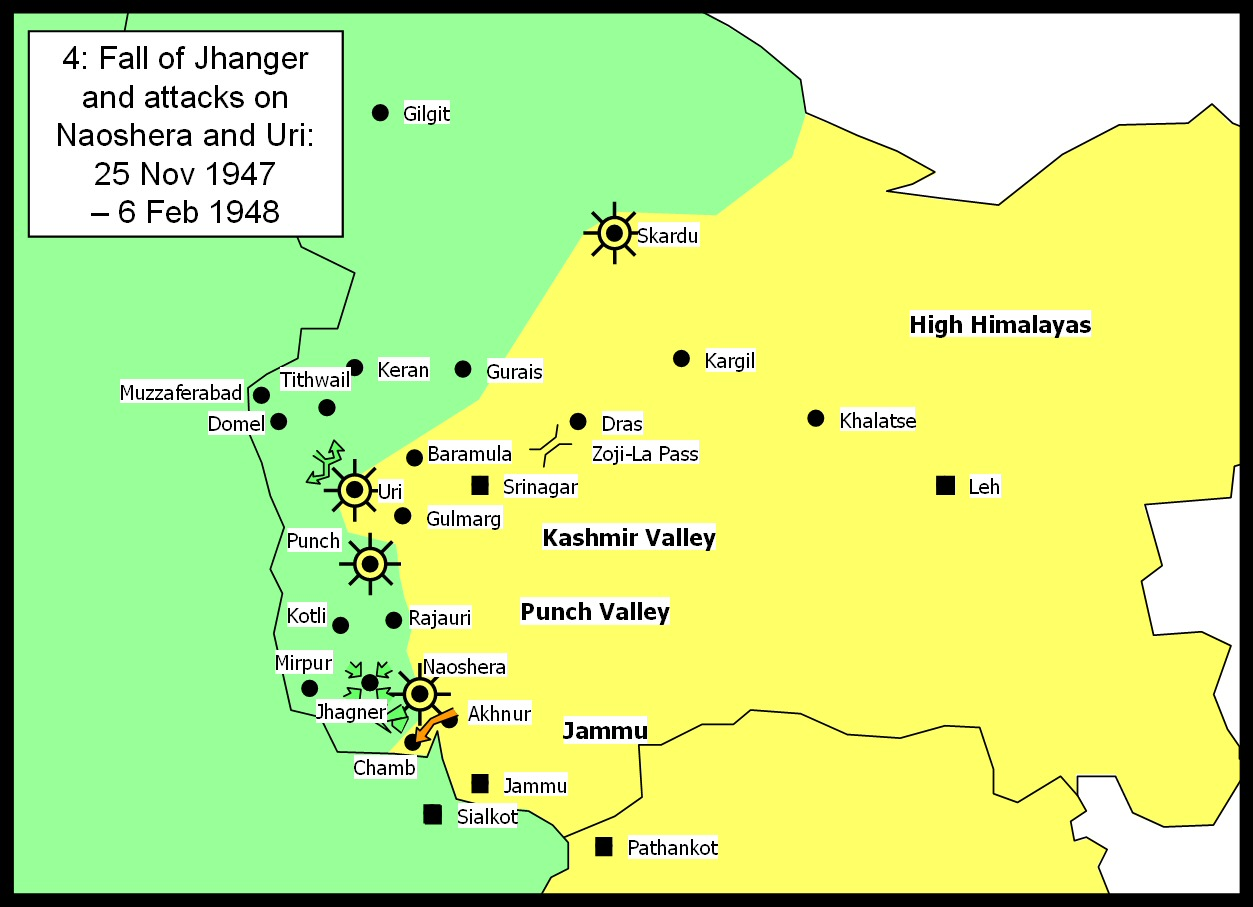
Towards the end of 1947, the Jammu and Kashmir State Forces garrisoned in Poonch were besieged from all sides, and the Indian Army forces based in Naushera were also under severe attack.

In Rawalpindi, then the hotbed of the First Kashmir War raging in 1947, Haight ran into the British correspondent Bill Sydney Smith of the Daily Express, who suggested to him that he could utilise his expertise in commanding the Pakistani tribal raiders engaged in the Kashmir War. Haight was sold on the idea. (Note: The correspondent too evidently benefited from the enterprise, who was able to run by-lines like, "Brigadier Russell Haight, the American soldier of fortune fighting with the tribesmen in Kashmir".)

He signed up with the Azad Kashmir provisional government, then based in Rawalpindi. He was introduced to Sardar Ibrahim Khan and was given a commission as a captain and sent to the Poonch front. Haight initially led the demolition party at Kotli. After he criticised the Azad Kashmir commanders there for their "boy scout tactics", the government promoted him to the rank of a "brigadier general". (Note: The Azad Kashmir commanders' demands to one up each other led to numerous new ranks being invented.) He later claimed to have commanded 8,000 troops. According to a New York Times report by Robert Trumbull, Haight was able to successfully discharge his command by playing on the vanity of the tribesmen and exploiting their tribal rivalries.

Haight employed guerrilla tactics. These included stringing blanket-draped wires across roads to ambush armor and scattering steel plates on sharp turns to cause tank tracks to slip. His forces advanced close enough to threaten the capital of Srinagar before being repelled by Indian paratroopers. He also documented the war, taking photographs of Dogra war crimes and tribesmen and sharing them with the press.

Haight is said to have had a "blaze of glory" during his command in Kashmir due to initial successes of the invasion.

By early 1948, Haight's engagement with the Kashmir War was over. Haight quit because of inadequate resources, scuffles with some of the fighters from Dir had played a role. There were also numerous assassination attempts on his life. The fighters are said to have attempted to steal Haight's truck and some captured guns, and he ended up killing a couple of them in the ensuing firefight. Trumbull states that, he was effectively a fugitive by the time he left Pakistan. He took a flight to the US with only $2.00 in his pocket.

The United States Department of State is said to have also intervened by threatening to revoke his passport and strip his citizenship. This forced him to leave Pakistan on 28 January 1948.

According to a Soviet writer, I. Andronov, Haight was "actively assisted by several resident agents of the British Intelligence Service and top-flight British representatives in India and Pakistan". According to journalist G. K. Reddy, then a PR official in the Azad Kashmir government, Russell K. Haight was "a senior officer of the US Office of Strategic Services (OSS)". (Note: The OSS was the intelligence agency of the US during World War II. It was the precursor to the modern CIA.) He is said to have operated in Azad Kashmir under the code name 'General Tariq'. (Note: 'General Tariq' was the code name assigned to the chief commander of all the rebel forces and raiders operating on behalf of Azad Kashmir, as per the Operation Gulmarg plan. Both Colonel Akbar Khan and Colonel Sher Khan later used the title while commanding the rebellion.)

Haight estimated that there were 15,000 tribal fighters in Kashmir, and a similar number on the move ("coming and going on dispersed along the border"). There were also said to be a fair number of Pakistani officers on leave involved in the war. Robert Trumbull narrated:

Although he insisted that the Kashmir fighting broke out in rebellion against atrocities committed upon Moslems by the Hindu Maharajah’s Dogra troops, Mr Haight characterized the Azad Kashmir Provisional Government ... as 'Pakistan puppets'. He also deeply implicated high Pakistan Government officials, notably the Premier of the North-West Frontier Province.

Indian sources state that Haight's actions in Kashmir, though personal, marked the beginning of American interests in Kashmir. They also claim that Haight's war role, along with British officer Major William Brown, was part greater "Anglo-American" interests. An Indian communist newspaper had described Haight as an American spy, while he was not.

=== Later career ===
After returning from South Asia, Haight went back to the US Army. In 1952, Sergeant First Class Haight was stationed at Fort Belvoir, Virginia, where he served as an instructor at the United States Army Engineer School.

He served in Korea, Germany, Bolivia and Vietnam, and retired from U.S. army in 1967 as a sergeant-major. He had seven rows of decorations and ribbons and numerous injuries from the various theatres in which he fought.

== Later life ==
Russell Haight later pursued a career in graphic arts, operating Aardvark Associates and publishing the "Grandad's Gang" comic strip and local cartoons. He later taught in Virginia and Oklahoma schools before retiring in 1992. He died on 13 May 2006 at the Grace Living Center in Norman and was buried with full military honours at Arlington National Cemetery.

== See also ==
- Kashmir Conflict

== Bibliography ==
- Trumbull, Robert (1956), As I See India, W. Sloane Associates
- Whitehead, Andrew (2007), A Mission in Kashmir, Penguin, ISBN 978-0-670-08127-1
