= Abdul Ali Malik =

Pakistani Army General (1907–1993)

Lieutenant general Abdul Ali Malik
- Born: 1907; Pindori, Punjab, British India (now Pakistan)
- Died: 16 April 1993 (aged 85–86); Phalia, Punjab, Pakistan
- Military career
- Allegiance: British Raj (1938–1947); Pakistan (1947–1974)
- Branch: (British Raj) British Indian Army; Pakistan Army
- Service years: 1938–1974
- Rank: Lieutenant General
- Unit: Punjab Regiment
- Commands: Pakistan Army 24 brigade; Pakistan Army 8th Infantry Division; I Corps
- Conflicts: Battle of Chawinda; Indo-Pakistani War of 1965; Indo-Pakistani War of 1971
- Awards: Hilal-i-Jurat (Crescent of Courage) Award by the Government of Pakistan

Abdul Ali Malik (1907–1993) was a three-star rank army general in the Pakistan Army and an infantry officer in the Pakistan Army from Nineteenth Battalion of Punjab Regiment who earned distinction of leading the combat infantry formations to mechanized warfare in Chawinda during the second war with India in 1965, and later commanded the I Corps during the third war with India in 1971.

== Biography ==
He was born in an Ahmadiyyah family in a small village called Pindori which is about 65 kilometres (40 mi) away from Rawalpindi. He joined Pakistan Army as a cadet-officer and later inducted in Pakistan Army Corps of Engineers. He completed his B.Sc. in electrical engineering from the Pakistan Military Academy, and served in the civil projects of the Pakistan Army. He is known to present at the constructions of the dam and had supervised the various projects in Punjab. His brother Lieutenant General Akhtar Hussain Malik was also an army general and was himself a hero of 1965 war too.

== Death ==
Abdul Ali Malik retired from the Army after commanding the I Corps at Mangla. He died in Phalia on 16 April 1993 at the age of 87.

== 1965 war ==
During the Indo-Pakistan War of 1965, Brigadier Abdul Ali Malik was commander of the 24th infantry brigade in the Sialkot-Phillurah-Chamb sector. At the start of the war, his brigade was ordered by the senior 15 division to defend the imaginary Indian attack at Jasser bridge. Even though, he was reluctant to move forward (because of the Indian comprehensive orders were caught on the Indian side of border) he was forced to take his command to Jasser sector. However, it later turned out that those orders were indeed true, and he was ordered to move back into the same position. It was at this time, that Pakistan Army tanks caught the Indian armoured brigade by surprise, and hence was commenced the largest tank battle after the World War II.

== 1971 war ==
Later promoted to Major General, Abdul Ali Malik commanded the 8th Infantry Division in the western sector of 1971 Indo-Pakistani War. His troops were stationed in the Sialkot sector, and apart from some skirmishes, a major all-out war didn't happen in the Sialkot Sector.
