= Government Islamia College =

Government Islamia College may refer to:

- Government Islamia College, Gujranwala, Gujranwala, Pakistan
- Government Islamia College, Civil Lines, Lahore, Lahore, Pakistan
- Government Islamia College, Chiniot, Pakistan

== See also ==
- Government Islamia Science College, Karachi, Pakistan
- Islamia College (disambiguation)
