= Hilal-e-Jurat =

Second-highest military award of Pakistan

Hilal-e-Jurat ہلالِ جرأت
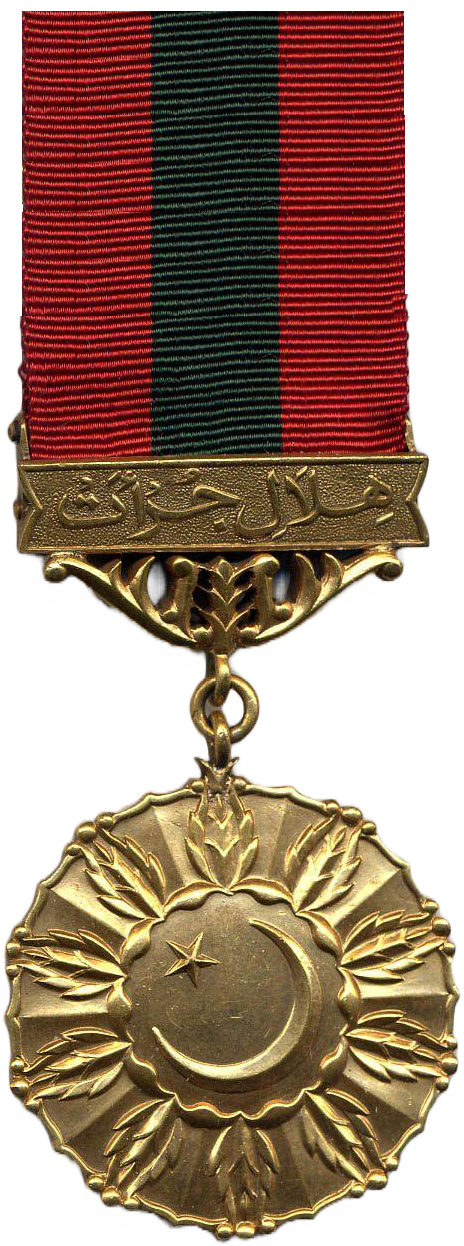
- Type: Military Decoration
- Awarded for: "...acts of valour, courage or devotion to duty, performed on land, at sea or in the air in the face of the enemy"
- Presented by: Pakistan
- Eligibility: Conferrable Upon All Ranks (Army, Navy and Air-Force)
- Post-nominals: HJ
- Clasps: 2
- Status: Currently Awarded
- Established: 16 March 1957
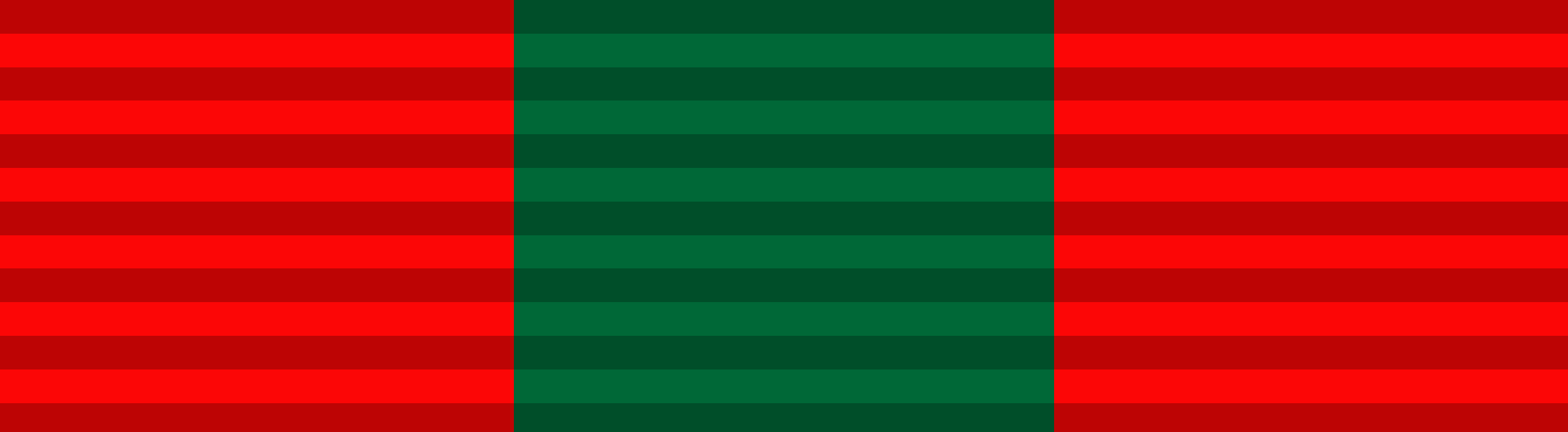
- Hilal-e-Jurat Ribbon

Precedence
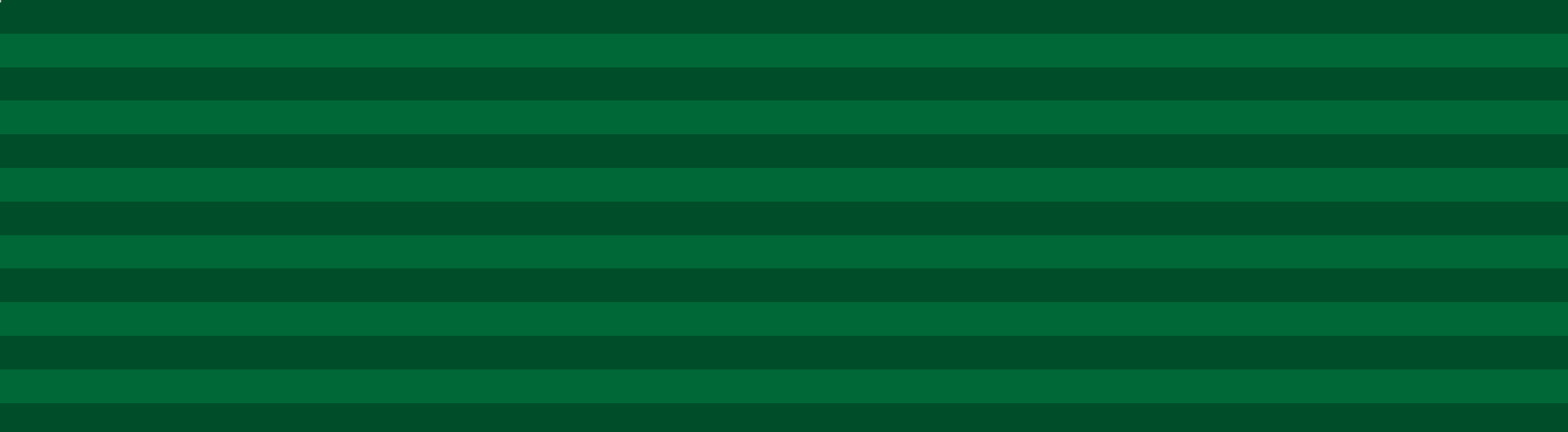
- Next (higher): Nishan-e-Haider

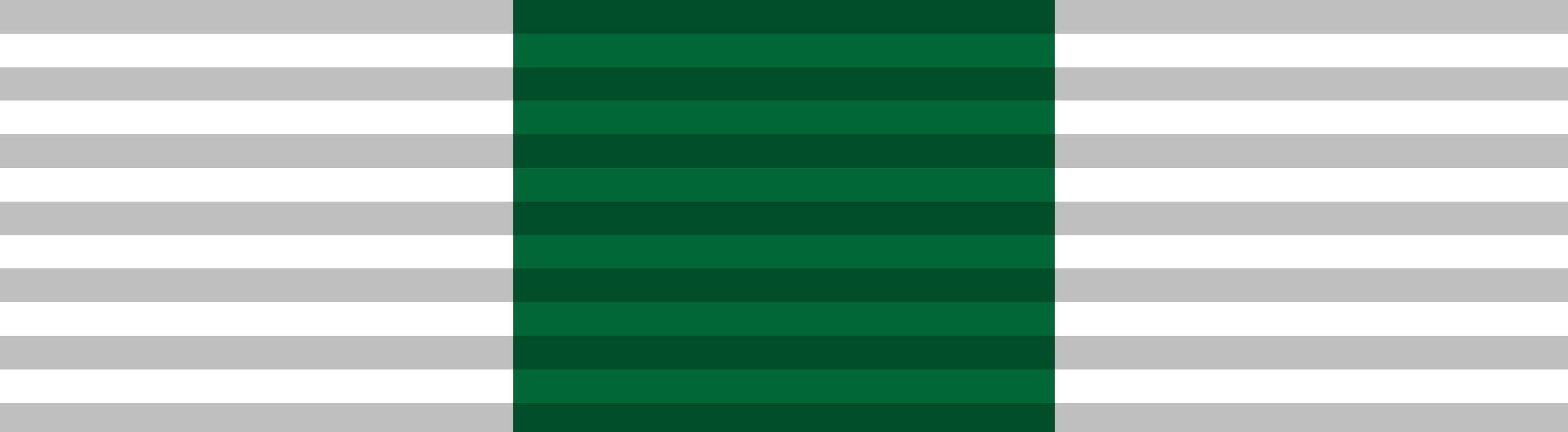
- Next (lower): Sitara-e-Jurat

The Hilal-e-Jurat (Urdu: ہلالِ جرأت [ɦəˈlaːl ə dʒʊˈraːt̪], as if it were Halāl-e-Jurāt; English: Crescent of Courage , sometimes spelled as Hilal-e-Jur'at, Hilal-e-Jurat, Hilal-i-Jurrat and Hilal-i-Juraat) (Note: Various official sources that are highly reputable spell the name of the medal differently, so the Pakistan Army website spelling is being taken as the official spelling construction.) is the second-highest military award of Pakistan out of a total of four gallantry awards that were created in 1957. In order of rank it comes after the Nishan-e-Haider (the Sign of the Lion, which is the equivalent to the Victoria Cross and the Medal of Honor under the British Honours System and the United States Honors System, respectively) coming before the Sitara-e-Jurat (the Star of Courage, which is the equivalent of the Distinguished Service Cross and the Silver Star, respectively).

It was created and declared for official use on 16 March 1957 by the President of Pakistan. The Hilal-i-Ju'rat is considered to be the equivalent of the Conspicuous Gallantry Cross and the Distinguished Service Cross. The medal is only conferrable upon all ranks. The award after this honour is the Sitara-e-Jurat (Star of Courage), and subsequent to this medal is the Tamgha-e-Jurat (Medal of Courage).

Unlike the Nishan-e-Haider, the Hilal-e-Jurat is the highest military award thus far that has been given to living Pakistanis to date. (Note: The Nishan-i-Haider has been given to ten people officially since conception in 1957, some have received it before its official creation when it was given posthumously soon after 1957, when it was made into law. Prior to this, under the British Honours System soldiers who displayed the utmost valiant acts of bravery were given the Victoria Cross.) The medallion has been given to many famous Pakistani army personnel, including many national heroes. Most notably, well known major generals, brigadiers and lieutenants of the Pakistan Armed Forces have all received the medal. (Note: See the list of recipients under Recipients)

The award holds significant benefits for the recipient including social, political and financial benefits. Land and pensions are awarded as recompense for serving in the Army of Pakistan on behalf of the State for acts of "valour and courage" during battle against the enemy. As of 2003 it was revealed that cash rewards have replaced land being given to the recipient under new defence housing schemes, which had taken place for the duration of the past twelve years perpetrated by the army, which was accounted to the Pakistan National Assembly as reported in the last decade.

== History ==
Established on 16 March 1957, the award was founded in celebration of Pakistan becoming a Republic and was formally given award status by the President of Pakistan. (Note: Shah Azizur Rahman, Quote: "The Parliamentary Secretary has said that the language inscribed on the military medals instituted by the President is in Arabic. May I know whether Sitara-i-Jurat is Arabic..." Dr. Aleem-al-Razee: Quote: "I want to ask the honourable Parliamentary Secretary to state the reason of inscribing Arabic script the titles Nishan-e-Haider, Hilal-e-Juraat, Sitara-e-Juraat, Sitara-e-Basalat and Tamgha-e-Basalat, which are words of the Persian language...") According to the official army website of Pakistan the award is given for "acts of valour, courage or devotion to duty, performed on land, at sea or in the air in the face of the enemy". (Note: Pakistan Army Website, Quote: "This award is conferrable on officers only, for acts of valour, courage or devotion to duty, performed on land, at sea or in the air in the face of the enemy...") The recipient of the award is able to use the distinguished honorific post-nominal letters "HJ" after his or her name. The apportion is considered to be the equivalent to the Distinguished Service Order under the British Honours System and the United States Distinguished Service Cross.

The names of the medals originate from the Persian language but are written in the form of the Arabic language. This was unusual since the major languages of Pakistan are Punjabi and Urdu. In the Pakistan Parliament there was a debate on why the names were given in Persian but were spelled in Arabic as some politicians were not entirely sure other medals made were inscribed of words from the Arabic language in the decade that it was made official.

Pakistan became a republic in 1956. Prior to that Pakistan had been a commonwealth realm and had as such come under the British honours system. When the award was established, however, it was instituted retrospectively back to the independence of Pakistan in 1947—and it was subsequently conferred on a number of Pakistani officers for service during the Indo-Pakistani War of 1947.

One particular unit that appeared in an article from Dawn, the Guards Battalion, was mentioned which emphasized that they had earned several Military Crosses and one Victoria Cross was congratulated in 2004 by the president. In the article it was emphasized that before the independence of Pakistan in 1947 the unit had been given British gallantry awards which suggests the Hilal-i-Jur'at didn't exist at the time.

== Appearance ==
It is a circular golden medal, surrounded by ten bundles of golden leaves with the Islamic crescent and star at its centre, suspended from a golden bar that reads "Hilal-i-Ju'rat" in Persian with Arabic lettering in gold. The ribbon attached to the golden bar is made up of three stripes, totalling two colours (two red and one green) that have been placed on the gallantary award. On the official Pakistan Army website the colour insignia is seen as being red, green, and red.

From the official Pakistan Army website

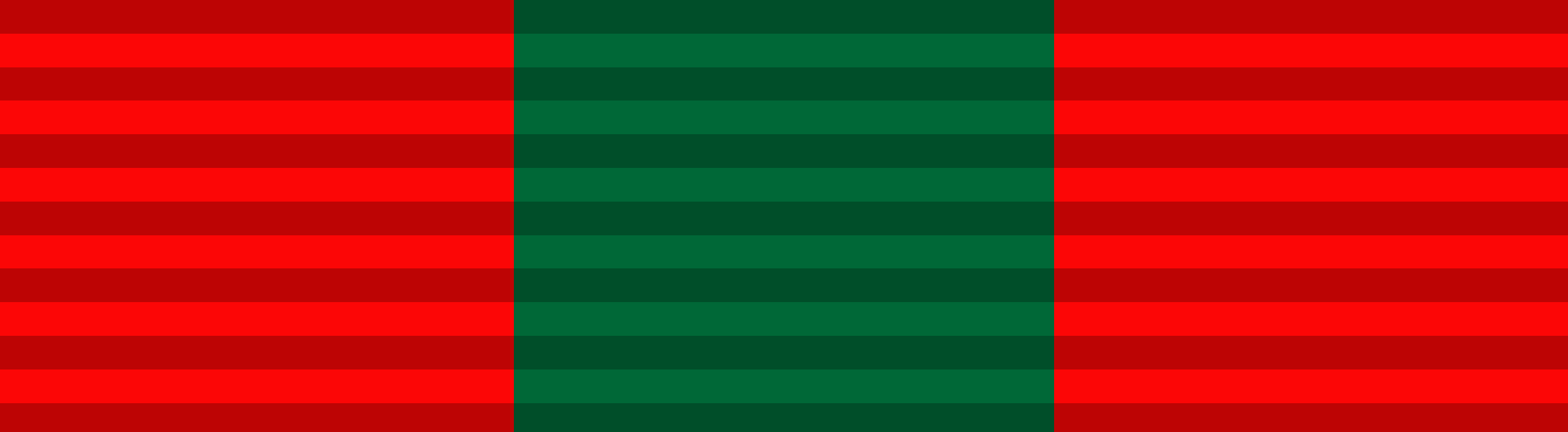
The Medals' ribbon colors

The golden bar display, Arabic lettering, Persian wording.

The golden bar and the suspension decoration as displayed.

The golden medallion displayed. 10 bundles of golden leaves.

== Eligibility and privileges ==
Officers serving in the Pakistani Armed Forces, including and limited to the Pakistan Army, the Pakistani Navy and the Pakistani Air Force, are the only eligible potential recipients for the award. It is conferred for acts of valour, courage, bravery and devotion to duty. The following is an extract, a word for word statement stating the eligibility of the medal on the Pakistan Army website.

This award is conferrable on officers only, for acts of valour, courage or devotion to duty, performed on land, at sea or in the air in the face of the enemy. – Pakistan Army (Website)

The recipients of the medal are allowed to use the honorific post nominal title letters "HJ" after their names as stated again by the Pakistan Army:

The recipient has the privilege to add the letters "HJ" after his name. – Pakistan Army (Website)

Although there rules are clear, there have been some challenges to change the rules. In March 2009 a group of policeman in Islamabad challenged the eligibility requirements by campaigning for the medal to be given to Faisal Khan, a police officer, who gave up his life by successfully preventing an Uzbek suicide bomber from entering a police station and causing massive widespread casualties. The journalist covering the incident wrote about the anger felt in the community, particularly from the policeman whom Faisal Khan worked with:

...So sad is the situation that the police have to submit a recommendation for an award 'Hilal-i-Jurrat' and more money for his brave feat...

– Nosheen Abbas, Journalist covering the life of Faisal Khan.

Khan had adamament dreams of joining the military in his youth or the police force. Whilst he was a police officer he was said to have wanted to "die in the line of duty", serving in the military for his country; many of his colleagues felt that this was a viable reason for him qualifying for the Hilal-i-Jur'at since he didn't receive any gallantry award, only a cash lump sum.

== Benefits ==
As well as commanding respect and admiration the Hilal-i-Ju'rat holds huge financial benefits for the recipient including land being given to the awardee. In accordance with Pakistan Law the recipient of the Hilal-i-Ju'rat is granted "two squares of land" according to retired Major General of the Pakistan Army Tajammul Hussain Malik, who in his 1991 book, The Story of My Struggle, revealed this.

Squadron Leader Safaraz was said to have received seventy-seven acres (0.3116 km^{2}) of land, which was later donated to a charity to benefit the poor and needy, for both his Hilal-i-Ju'rat and the Sitara-i-Ju'rat medals. (Note: Quote: "His selfless devotion to duty was acknowledged by the award of a Sitara-e-Jurat (along with Cecil and Yunus), as well as a Hilal-e-Jurat. PAF Base, Rafiqui (Shorkot), named after him, rekindles the spirit of his chivalry. (Sarfaraz Rafiqui Welfare Trust, based on 77 acres of prime agricultural land in Faisalabad Division, continues to benefit the poor and the needy. The land, given by the Government of Pakistan as recompense with the awards of HJ & SJ, was most generously bequeathed by Sarfaraz-s parents for the Trust, which is administered by the PAF)" – Captain Kaiser Tufail, Pakistan Defence Journal (Online) About the author Quote: "(Group Captain Kaiser Tufail was commissioned in 1975. He has flown virtually all types of combat aircraft in PAF including the F-16. He commanded a Mirage Squadron and later a Flying Wing. A graduate of Air War College, he has also been on its faculty. He holds a Master-s degree in Strategic Studies. For his meritorious services he has been awarded Tamgha-e-Imtiaz (Military) by the Government of Pakistan.)".)

Mathematically, if the seventy seven acres is divided and the sums calculated, one square of land, which was awarded to the Sitara-i-Jur'at recipient (according to the book The Story of My Struggle), then this would mean "one square of land" is the equivalent of 25.41 acres (0.1028 km^{2}), making "two squares of land" equal to 50.82 acres (0.2057 km^{2}). The method of calculating the sums is detailed as below with two sources being taken in for consideration to calculate the land awardances on a logical basis. (Note: How The Calculation Was Carried Out: Information From Sources 1 Square of Land is awarded for the Sitara-i-Jur'at, 2 Squares of Land for the Hilal-Jur'at. Safaraz was awarded 77 acres for both his Sitara-i-Jur'at and Hilal-i-Jur'at medals. This is the equivalent of 3 Squares of land altogether when added up. Logistical Method 77 acres divided by 3 Squares of Land will give you the land in acres given for 1 square of land. Multiply (77 acres divided by 3) altogether by 2 and this gives the 2 Squares of Land in acres for the Hilal-i-Jur'at medal. Quick Representation: $\mathrm{1\ Square\ of\ Land} =(\frac{\mathrm{77\ acres}}{\mathrm{3\ Squares\ of\ Land}}) = 25.41\ acres$ $\mathrm{2\ Squares\ of\ Land} =(\frac{\mathrm{77\ acres}}{\mathrm{3\ Squares\ of\ Land}}) \cdot 2\ Squares\ of\ Land\ = 50.82\ acres$)

$$\mathrm{1\ Square\ of\ Land} =(\frac{\mathrm{77\ acres}}{\mathrm{3\ Squares\ of\ Land}}) \cdot 1 = 25.41\ acres$$

$$\mathrm{2\ Squares\ of\ Land} =(\frac{\mathrm{77\ acres}}{\mathrm{3\ Squares\ of\ Land}}) \cdot 2 = 50.82\ acres$$

It was revealed by the Pakistan news agency Dawn.com, that the gallantry awards have major cash rewards for the recipients and in the last twelve years this has replaced land awardances given to the recipient under defence housing schemes, which was reported in 2003 to the National Assembly of Pakistan. Rs. 500,000 rupees (£3679.98 or $5824.13, or €4317.5 as of September 2010) are given as recompense for obtaining the Hilal-i-Ju'rat during service. (Note: "The minister--" Defence Minister Rao Sikandar Iqba "--said that no allotment of land was being made to the army personnel on receiving gallantry awards. However, cash awards, attached to the military awards, were given to them. Winner of Nishan-i-Haider is awarded Rs 1 million, Hilal-i-Jura't Rs 500,000, Sitar-i-Jura'at Rs 400,000, Tamgha-i-Jura'at 300,000, Sitar-i-Basalat 200,000 and Tamgha-i-Basalat Rs 100,000. -- Dawn Reporter)

During the Kargil Conflict in 1999, however, land was given to those that participated in the war and to those that gained gallantry awards. The Kargil Conflict was the only exception to this when it came to the land awards when the housing schemes were taking place.

== Recipients ==
General Ayub Khan, the first military ruler of Pakistan who became a controversial figure towards the end of his presidency, serving as the second President of Pakistan between 1958 and 1969, also received the award. Notably A.O. Mitha, a legendary major general who played a significant part in the 1971 Liberation War in which he was stationed in East Pakistan (modern day Bangladesh), which ultimately led to the Secession of Bangladesh, was also bestowed the medal.
Brigadier (r) Saadullah Khan, the only living soldier in Pakistan Army's history to have been recommended for Nishan-e-Haider for the demonstration of unmatched gallantry in 1971 war. His book "From East Pakistan to Bangladesh", guides the army's textbook curriculum.

He maintained a soft-spoken demeanor and was noted for his spiritual orientation.

He was seen as being an oddball and 'soft on Bengalis,' fought the hardest in the war.

He was recommended for a Nishan e Haider but was awarded Hilal e Jurat instead.

Brigadier Saadullah, who had fought gallantly in East Pakistan.

Other notable heroic personnel of the Pakistan Army who died during service and were given the medal in the line of fire include Ghulam Hussain Shaheed for his duty in standing his ground during an ambush by the Indian army near Pakistan's modern day border, near Kasur (of which it was later renamed after him). He was said to have held the national flag of Pakistan until his last breath when he was fatally wounded twice during battle with Indian armed soldiers.

=== Sarfaraz Ahmed Rafiqui ===
Portrait of Squadron Leader Sarfaraz Ahmed Rafiqui, recipient of the Hilal-i-Jur'at, earned owing to his exceptional stance during the 1965 Indo-Pak War

Most significantly of all Squadron Leader Sarfaraz Ahmed Rafiqui, considered a national hero in the region, was bestowed the award after a war between neighbouring countries Pakistan and India erupted. He earned the prestigious award for bravely fighting and defending his pilots against the Indian Air Force during the Indo-Pakistani War of 1965 in which he participated to the end. He was shot down over the Indian air base in the final moments of air warfare.

His equipment malfunctioned and subsequently he was left in a position to attempt to lure enemy pilots away from concentrating fire on the two fully functioning jets left on the battlefield. Taking on heavy fire during the air attack on 6 September, he was finally brought down and crashed in the airfield. His parents were informed he was given the honour in a telegram sent by the PAF.

The mission he was sent on went awry as the result of his guns jamming mid-battle, and as the fighting commenced IAF pilot, Flight Lieutenant DN Rathore of 27th Squadron, shot down his fighter jet after Rafiqui's unit caused significant damage to the enemy. It is reported eight Hunters and five pilots were destroyed, which included the defeat of the IAF Squadron Leader Ajit Kumar 'Peter' Rawlley of the 7th Squadron of the Indian Air Forces. Rafiqui's qualification for the posthumous honour was enhanced as a direct result of the prestigious Best Pilot Trophy from the Pakistan Air Force Academy in Risalpur where he received it five months after graduating, leading him to be apportioned the penultimate gallantry award from the state, the Hilal-i-Ju'rat after the 1965 war had ended. He, along with his subordinates, Cecil Chaudhry and Yunis Hussain, were given the Sitara-i-Jur'at. Chaudhry was the only survivor left who made it back to the home airbase. Pakistan's third airbase, the Rafiqui Airbase (Shorkot Cantonment), is named after Sarfaraz. His body was never found and still lies somewhere around the Halwara Airbase where the battle took place.

Rafiqui, HJ, SJ, (Shaheed) was my role model. As a matter of fact he was the role model for a large number of pilots in the PAF. He was a born leader and officers like him you come across once in a lifetime. As a pilot he was the best.

— Group Captain Cecil Chaudhry, SJ when asked who was his role model and inspiration (2001).

=== List of notable recipients ===
Years of Service	Name	Military title(s)	Army section (unit)	Region	Village	Post-nominal title(s)
1932–1960	Mian Hayaud Din	Major General	Pakistan Army (PA-18)	Khyber Pakhtunkhwa	Peshawar	HJ, MBE, MC
1957–1963	Muhammad Aslam Khan	Brigadier	Pakistan Army (PA-919)	Jammu Kashmir		HJ, MC, FK, SJ
1933–1958	Sher Ali Khan	Major General	Pakistan Army (PA-24)	Haryana	Pataudi	HJ
1928–1958	Muhammad Ayub Khan	Field Marshal	Pakistan Army (PA-10)	Khyber Pakhtunkhwa	Rehana	HJ, HPk, MBE
1935–1965	Musa Khan Hazara	General	Pakistan Army (PA-28)	Balochistan	Quetta	HJ, H.Pk., HQA, MBE
1947–1969	Akhtar Hussain Malik	Lieutenant General	Pakistan Army (PA-148)	Punjab	Pindori	HJ
	Abrar Hussain	Major General	Pakistan Army (PA-159)			HJ, MBE
1934–1975	Amir Abdullah Khan Niazi	Lieutenant General	Pakistan Army (PA-477)	Punjab		HJ (Bar), SPk, SK, MC
1947–1974	Abdul Ali Malik	Lieutenant General	Pakistan Army (PA-524)	Rawalpindi	Pindori	HJ
	Amjad Ali Chaudhri	Brigadier	Pakistan Army (PA-624)			HJ
	Ahsan Rashid Shami	Brigadier	Pakistan Army (PA-???)			HJ
1948–1974	Naseerullah Babar	Major General	Pakistan Army (PA-???)			HJ (Bar)
1941–1971	A.O. Mitha	Major General	Pakistan Army (PA-649)	Maharashtra	Bombay	HJ, SPk, SQA
	Abdul Qayum Sher	Brigadier	Pakistan Army (PA-332)			HJ
1946–1971	Ghulam Hussain Shaheed	Lieutenant Colonel	Pakistan Army (PA-4049)	British Punjab	Laliani	HJ
	Muhammad Akram Raja	Lieutenant Colonel	Pakistan Army (PA-3927)	Khyber Pakhtunkhwa	Khanpur	HJ
	Amir Hamza Khan	Major General	Pakistan Army (PA-1986)			HJ, SJ
1982–1987	Muhammad Iqbal Shaheed	Captain	Pakistan Army (PA-???)	Pushtoon Garhi	North-West Frontier Province of Khyber Pakhtunkhwa	HJ
1941–1969	Nur Khan	Air Marshal	Pakistan Air Force (PAF-???)	Chakwal District	Talagang (Dandi)	HJ, HS, HQA, SPk
1953–1971	M Zafar Masud	Gp.Captain, Air Commodore	Pakistan Air Force (PAF-???)			HJ
1953–1965	Sarfaraz Ahmed Rafiqui	Squadron Leader	Pakistan Air Force (PAF-3550)			HJ, SJ
1944–1972	Abdul Rahim Khan	Air Marshal	Pakistan Air Force (PAF-???)			HJ, HQA, SPk, SBt
1948-1981	Inamul Haque Khan	Air Commodore	Pakistan Air Force (PAF-???)			HJ
1959–1966	Afzal Rahman Khan	Vice Admiral	Pakistan Navy (PN-73)			HJ

== Controversy ==
=== Retractions ===
During the Bangladesh War of 1971 several HJs were given out and later retracted.

=== Faisal Khan ===
A photograph of Khan is placed over a wreath where his main body parts lay, after the blast.

On 23 March 2009, Faisal Khan, who was outside the gates of the "G-7 special police branch", was killed when he stopped and refused to let go of an apparent suicide bomber of Uzbek origin who wanted to blow up the police compound near Sitara Market in Islamabad. After he was killed many around the area were thankful for his sacrifice, especially the local police, who thought Khan deserved being given heroic status by the country. Although the bomber did kill several people, it was thought he could have done more damage by causing a high number of casualties which could have arisin if Khan didn't stop the man going towards the branch. The building was described as being "poorly guarded" at the time. Khan only received Rs. 150,000 (£1107.68 or $1753.41 or €1300.87 as of September 2010), which was given to his siblings, as he had no parents nor a family of his own.

Despite the poor conditions of the police and the faulty hierarchic and bureaucratic system in the police force, he sank with his ship. But was he acknowledged by the state as a hero? Certainly not. Prime Minister's adviser on Interior Senator Rehman Malik had announced Rs 150,000 for his family – which is a measly amount for someone's life – for someone who sacrificed his life for others and is nothing less than a national hero[...] Sadly the state too has not shown its appreciation of such a man who saved the lives of so many especially in a time when they are most ill-equipped and the prime targets[...] Its individuals like Faisal Khan who make the difference but get little acknowledgement. When will the government realise that their faces are saved from public humiliation because of the sacrifice of many Faisal Khans[?]

– Nosheen Abbas, documenting the life Faisal Khan, 3 April 2009.

Controversy arose when this amount was seen as not being nearly enough for what he had done, and that the thirty-year-old Khan deserved more for his sacrifice such as gaining the prestigious Hilal-i-Jur'at for his duty in guarding the station. In memory, because of his aspirations in wanting to always "join the army or police force" in his youth and adult life, some thought he deserved the gallantry award in honour for what he did in protecting and saving the lives of many people around the area. The police force decided to campaign against the low sum of money that was given to him by submitting a recommendation for him to receive the Hilal-i-Jur'at to the government of Pakistan, as they saw it as an embarrassment for the state in not recognising Khan as a "national hero".
