= Malik Munawar Khan Awan =

Pakistani War Hero and Veteran of the Second World War

Major Malik Munawar Khan Awan ملک منور خان اعوان Sitara-e-Jurat
- Munawar Awan decorated by Field Marshal Muhammad Ayub Khān
- Born: 1917; Chakwal, Punjab Province, British Indian Empire
- Died: 10 May 1981 (aged 63–64)
- Military career
- Allegiance: British Raj (1937–1942); Azad Hind (1942–1945); Pakistan (1947–1957)
- Branch: British Indian Army; Indian National Army; Pakistan Army
- Rank: Major
- Unit: 21 Azad Kashmir Regiment
- Conflicts: World War II; Battle of Imphal; Indo-Pakistani War of 1965; Operation Gibraltar
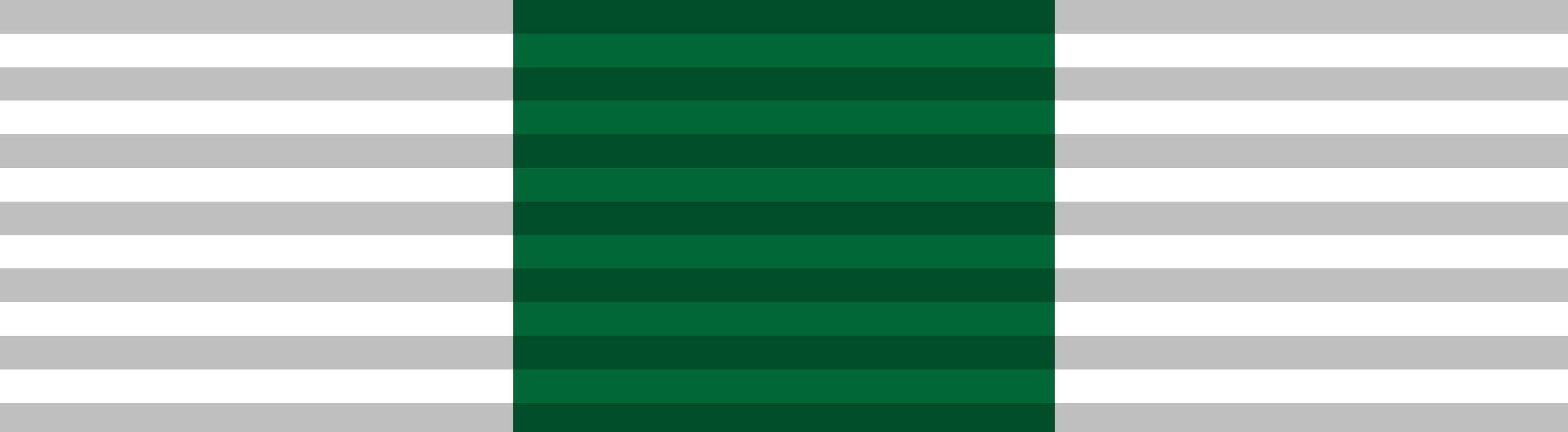
- Awards: Sitara-e-Jurat

Malik Munawar Khan Awan (ملک منور خان اعوان) was a Major rank officer in the Pakistan Army, whose career had begun in the British Indian Army and included spells in the Imperial Japanese Army and the revolutionary Indian National Army that fought against the Allies in World War II where he commanded 2nd INA Guerrilla Battalion during famous Battle of Imphal. He received a gallantry award for his work during Operation Gibraltar in 1965.

== Early life ==
Munawar was born to a Muslim family of the Awan tribe in Chakwal, Punjab, British India. As a young boy, he was spotted winning an athletics race that he had entered on the spur of the moment and was nurtured by the British for a role in the army.

== Career ==
Awan was among those captured and made prisoner of war by Japanese forces while trying to defend Singapore in World War II. He learned the Japanese language while incarcerated and his fluency brought him to the attention of his captors. They moved him out of the prison camp and enlisted him in the Imperial Japanese Army, where he received special training.

When the Indian National Army, led by Subhas Chandra Bose, was formed in 1942, Awan joined its fight for Indian independence from British rule. He was captured by the Allied forces and returned to India to stand trial for treason at the end of World War II.

Awan was freed, along with other INA prisoners, when the Partition of India occurred. He moved to Pakistan and was invited to join the Pakistan Army by prime minister Liaquat Ali Khan. He then joined the Azad Kashmir Regular Forces (AKRF), which later became the Azad Kashmir Regiment.

Operation Gibraltar was launched in July 1965 with the aim of Pakistani infiltration of Jammu & Kashmir. Awan, who now held the rank of major, was involved in this, leading troops in heavy fighting at a pass near to Rajouri. He controlled an area of around 500 square miles for a period of three months and, according to Lt General Mahmud Ahmed in his book War 1965, Munawar enjoyed full support from the local population of the valley. By the time the Second Kashmir War ended, Munawar was in effective control of Rajouri valley and welcomed UN military observers who landed in Rajouri valley to monitor the ceasefire. However, after the Tashkent Agreement between India and Pakistan, he was ordered to withdraw his forces and return to Rawalpindi.

Awan was awarded the Sitara-i-Jurat for his actions in the Rajouri valley, and was also referred to as the "King of Rajouri" by Field Marshal Ayub Khan. He died a few years later.

== Memorials ==
Munawar Pass, a pass in Pir Panjal mountain range north of Pir ki Gali overlooking the town of Rajouri in the union territory of Kashmir was named after Major Munawar by the locals.
