= Saadullah Khan (military officer) =

Pakistani military officer

Brigadier Saadullah Khan HJ
- سعد اللہ خان
- Born: 1926 (age 99–100); Sargodha, West Pakistan
- Military career
- Allegiance: Pakistan
- Branch: Pakistan Army
- Service years: 1951 to 1973
- Rank: Brigadier
- Unit: 2/16 Punjab Regiment
- Commands: 2/16 Punjab Regiment; 27 Infantry Brigade
- Awards: Hilal-i-Jur'at; Sitara-e-Khidmat

Saadullah Khan (Urdu: سعد اللہ خان; born 1926) was a Brigadier in the Pakistan Army who served during the Indo-Pakistani war of 1971. He commanded the 27 Infantry Brigade during Operation Cactus Lily and was subsequently awarded the Hilal-i-Jur'at for his contributions. He also received the Sitara-e-Khidmat for his relief work during the 1970 Bhola cyclone.

== Early life and education ==
Khan was born in 1926 in Sargodha, West Pakistan. He completed his education at Government College Faisalabad and Government College Sargodha. As a student, he was actively involved in the Pakistan Movement.

== Military career ==
Khan was commissioned into the 2/16 Punjab Regiment through the 3rd Pakistan Military Academy Long Course. He was awarded the Sword of Honour for the best overall performance in his course.

In June 1970, Khan was appointed Colonel Staff of the 14th Division, a senior staff position in the Eastern Command. Following the 1970 Bhola cyclone, he travelled to affected areas with a small group of officers and non-commissioned officers to distribute relief supplies and assist the local administration in rehabilitation efforts. For this work, he was awarded the Sitara-e-Khidmat.

During the Indo-Pakistani war of 1971, Khan served as Commanding Officer of the 27 Infantry Brigade. He is notably associated with Operation Cactus Lily, the assault crossing of the Meghna River carried out by Indian forces, which took place on the night of 9 to 10 December 1971. For his conduct during the war, he was awarded the Hilal-i-Jur'at.
