= Operation Gibraltar =

1965 Pakistani military operation

- Part of the Indo-Pakistani war of 1965
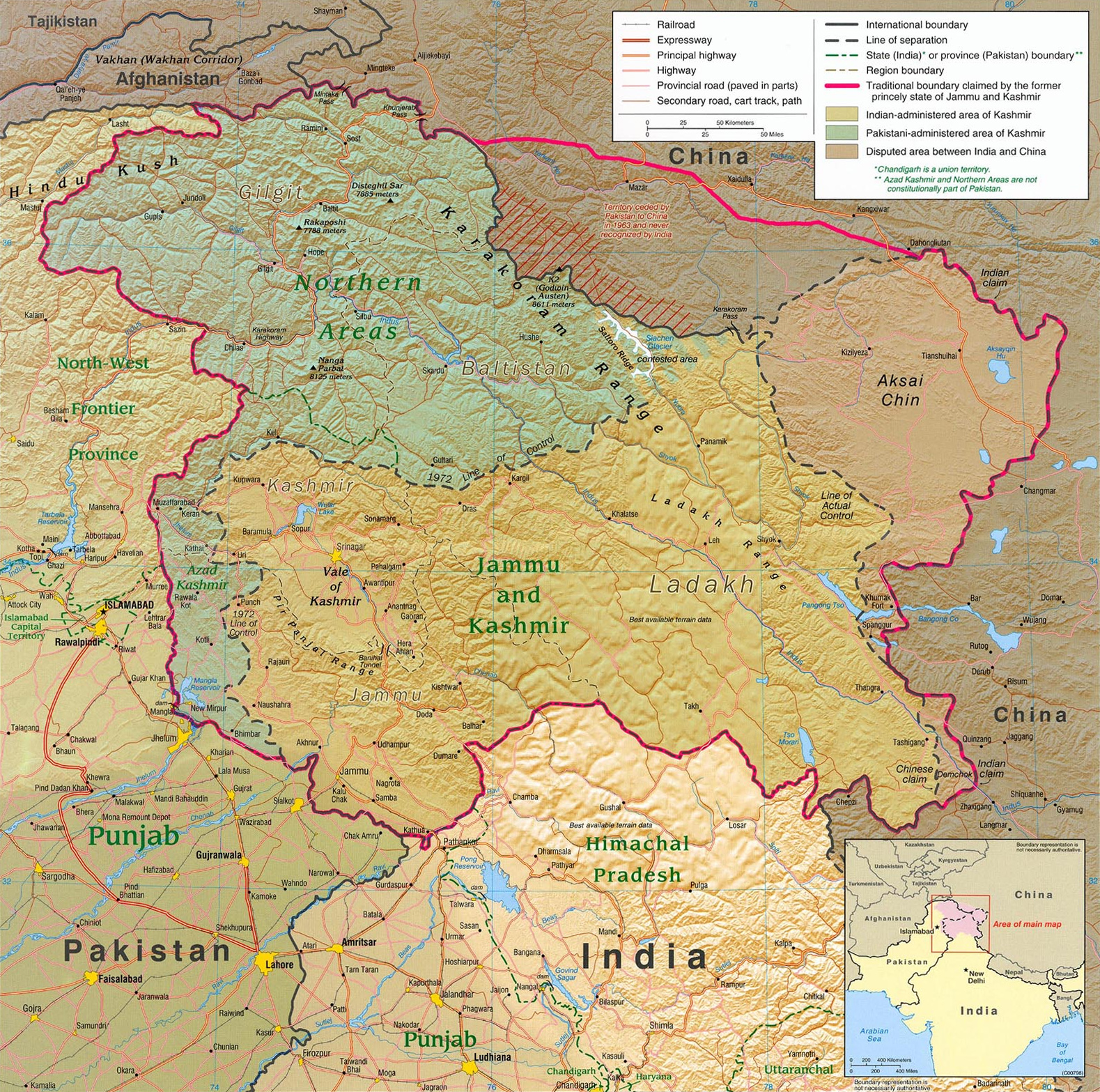
- Geopolitical map of Kashmir provided by the United States CIA, c. 2004
Date	August 1965
Location	Jammu and Kashmir
Result	Pakistani operational failure

Belligerents
India	Pakistan

Commanders and leaders
Gen. J. N. Chaudhuri; Brig. Gen. Z. C. Bakhshi	Maj. Gen. Akhtar Hussain Malik

Strength
100,000+	20,000 – 30,000

Casualties and losses
Unknown	Unknown

Operation Gibraltar was the codename of a military operation planned and executed by the Pakistan Army in the territory of Indian-administered Jammu and Kashmir in August 1965. The operation's strategy was to covertly cross the Line of Control (LoC) and incite the Muslim-majority Kashmiri population's uprising against the Indian Government. The military leadership believed that a rebellion (sparked by Operation Gibraltar) by the local Kashmiri population against Indian authorities would serve as Pakistan's casus belli against India on the international stage. Pakistan's leadership specifically chose this name to draw a parallel to the Muslim conquest of the Iberian Peninsula that was launched from Gibraltar.

In August 1965, Pakistani army troops from the Azad Kashmir Regular Force, disguised as locals, entered Jammu and Kashmir from Azad Kashmir with the goal of fomenting an insurgency amongst the Muslim-majority population in the Kashmir Valley. However, the strategy went awry from the outset due to poor coordination, and the infiltrators' presence was soon disclosed to the Indian military. Following the operation and discovery of the Pakistani army infiltration, India responded by deploying more troops in the Kashmir Valley and the Indian Army subsequently began its assault against the Pakistani army infiltrators operating in the region.

In August 1965, India crossed the ceasefire line, and attacked the Haji Pir pass inside Pakistan’s Azad Kashmir. Pakistan launched a major offensive named Operation Grand Slam on 1 September 1965 in India's Jammu and Kashmir, sparking the Indo-Pakistani War of 1965, which was the first major engagement between the two neighbouring states since the Indo-Pakistani War of 1947–1948. Thus Operation Gibraltar became the immediate cause of Indo-Pakistani War of 1965.

== Background ==
Following the First Kashmir War (1947–1948), which saw India maintaining its hold over two-thirds of Kashmir, Pakistan sought an opportunity to win the remaining Kashmir areas. In 1960s Pakistan received 700 million dollars of military aid from United States, by signing a defense agreement in 1954, which significantly modernized Pakistan's military equipment. After the defeat in 1962 Sino-Indian War, the Indian Military was undergoing massive changes both in personnel and equipment. During this period, despite being numerically smaller than the Indian military, Pakistan's armed forces had a qualitative edge in air power and armor over India, which Pakistan sought to utilize before India completed its defense build-up. Operation Desert Hawk by the Pakistani Military in the Rann of Kutch in April-June summer of 1965, where Indian and Pakistani forces clashed, resulted in some positives for Pakistan. Moreover, in December 1963, the disappearance of a holy relic from the Hazratbal shrine in Srinagar, created turmoil and intense Islamic feeling among Muslims in the valley, which was viewed by Pakistan as ideal for revolt. These factors bolstered the Pakistani command's thinking: that the use of covert methods followed by the threat of an all out war would force a resolution in Kashmir. Assuming that a weakened Indian military would not respond, Pakistan chose to send in "mujahideens" and Pakistan Army regulars into Jammu and Kashmir.

== Planning ==
The original plan for the operation, codenamed Gibraltar, was conceived and prepared as early as the 1950s; however it seemed appropriate to push this plan forward given the scenario. Backed by then foreign minister Zulfiqar Ali Bhutto and others, the aim was an "attack by infiltration" by a specially trained irregular force of some 40,000 men, highly motivated and well armed. It was reasoned that the conflict could be confined only to Kashmir. In the words of retired Pakistani General Akhtar Hussain Malik, the aims were "to defreeze the Kashmir problem, weaken Indian resolve, and bring India to the conference table without provoking general war." As a result, groundwork and intelligence gathering for execution of the plan was laid by launching "Operation Nusrat", the purpose of which was to locate gaps in the Cease Fire Line (CFL) that were to serve as entry points for the mujahideen, and to gauge the response of the Indian army and the local population.

== Execution ==
Name of Force	Area of operation
Salahudin	Srinagar Valley
Ghaznavi	Mendhar-Rajauri
Tariq	Kargil – Drass
Babur	Nowshera-Sundarbani
Qasim	Bandipura-Sonarwain
Khalid	Qazinag-Naugam
Nusrat	Tithwal-Tangdhar
Sikandar	Gurais
Khilji	Kel-Minimarg

Despite initial reservations by the President of Pakistan Ayub Khan, the operation was set in motion. In the first week of August 1965 (some sources put it at 24 July), Pakistani troops who were members of Azad Kashmir Regular Force (Now Azad Kashmir Regiment) began to cross the Cease Fire Line dividing Indian- and Pakistani-held Kashmir across the Pir Panjal Range into Gulmarg, Uri and Baramulla. Several columns were to occupy key heights around the Kashmir valley and encourage a general revolt, which would be followed by direct combat by Pakistani troops. According to Indian sources as many as 30,000 – 40,000 men had crossed the line, while Pakistani sources put it at 5,000 -7,000 only. These troops known as the "Gibraltar Force" were organized and commanded by Major General Akhtar Hussain Malik, GOC 12 Division. The troops were divided into 10 forces (5 companies each). The 10 forces were given different code names, mostly after historically significant Muslim rulers, with the exception of 'Sikandar', named after Alexander the Great. The operation's name, Gibraltar, itself was chosen for the Islamic connotations. The 8th century Muslim conquest of the Iberian Peninsula was launched from Gibraltar, a situation not unlike that Pakistan envisaged for Indian Kashmir, which involved the planned invasion of Kashmir as part of Operation Gibraltar. The areas chosen were mainly on the de facto Cease Fire line as well as in the populous Kashmir Valley.

The plan was multi-pronged. Infiltrators would mingle with the local populace and incite them to rebellion. Meanwhile, guerrilla warfare would commence, destroying bridges, tunnels and highways, harassing enemy communications, logistic installations and headquarters as well as attacking airfields, with a view to create the conditions of an "armed insurrection" in Kashmir — leading to a national uprising against Indian rule. It was assumed that India would neither counter-attack, nor involve itself in another full-scale war, and the capture of Kashmir would rapidly follow. Out of the 9 Infiltrating Forces, only Ghaznavi Force under command Maj Malik Munawar Khan Awan managed to achieve its objective in Mehndar-Rajouri area.

=== Ghaznavi Force ===
The Ghaznavi Force (Urdu:غزنوی فورس), named after Mahmud of Ghazni of the Ghaznavid Empire, was an auxiliary Special Operations unit formed by the Pakistan Army as part of Operation Gibraltar in 1965 to infiltrate Jammu and Kashmir in the hopes of provoking a local revolt against the Indian regime there. It had a strength of approximately 200 and was composed of regular soldiers of the Azad Kashmir Regular Force and commandos from the Pakistani Special Service Group. Its commander was decorated officer Major Malik Munawar Khan Awan SJ.

The Ghaznavi Force was one of 10 units to be assembled for the operation by the Pakistan Army. It infiltrated Jammu and Kashmir in July 1965 to operate in the Poonch-Rajuri area. It was resupplied with ammunition dropped from Pakistan Air Force planes. Towards the end of August, most infiltrators had been found, captured or killed. Those that survived were asked to pull back when India attacked Lahore.

== Reasons for Failure ==
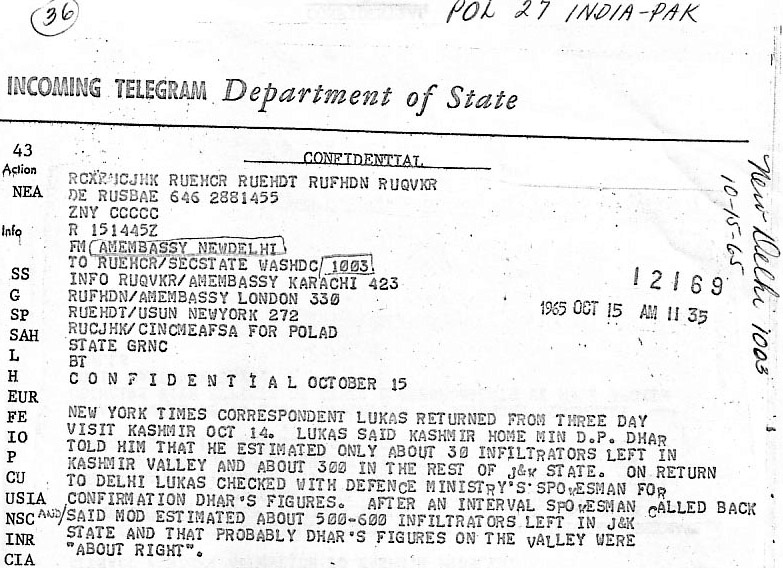
A declassified US State Department telegram that confirms the existence of hundreds of infiltrators in the Indian state of Jammu and Kashmir.

While the covert infiltration was a complete failure that ultimately led to the Indo-Pakistani War of 1965, military analysts have differed on whether the plan itself was flawed. Some have held that the plan was well-conceived but was let down by poor execution, but almost all Pakistani and neutral analysts have maintained that the entire operation was "a clumsy attempt" and doomed to collapse. The Pakistani Army's failures started with the supposition that a generally discontented Kashmiri people, given the opportunity provided by the Pakistani advance, would revolt against their Indian rulers, bringing about a swift and decisive surrender of Kashmir. The Kashmiri people, however, did not revolt. Instead, the Indian Army was provided with enough information to learn of Operation Gibraltar and the fact that the Army was battling not insurgents, as they had initially supposed, but Pakistani Army regulars.

According to then Chief of the Pakistan Air Force, Air Marshal Nur Khan, there was little coordination amongst the military services on the impending operation. According to him "the (Pakistan) army "misled the nation with a big lie" - that India rather than Pakistan provoked the war - and that Pakistan won a "great victory. And since the "lie" was never rectified, the Pakistani "army came to believe its own fiction, (and) has continued to fight unwanted wars". Pakistani author Pervaiz Iqbal Cheema notes that Musa Khan, Pakistan's Chief of the Army Staff, was reportedly so confident that the plan would succeed and conflict would be localized to Kashmir that he did not inform the Air Force, as he believed the operation would not require any major air action. Many senior Pakistani military officers and political leaders were unaware of the impending crisis, thus surprising not only India, but also Pakistan itself.

Many senior officials also were against the plan, as a failure could lead to an all-out war with India, which many wanted to avoid.

== See also ==
- Operation Desert Hawk
- Indo-Pakistan Wars
- Kargil War
