= Mohammad Aslam Khan Khalil =

- Born: January 7, 1950 (age 75); Jhansi, U.P., India

Mohammad Aslam Khan Khalil, M.A.K. Khalil or Aslam Khalil (born January 7, 1950) is a theoretical physicist known for his leading research in atmospheric physics. Early in his career, he worked on quantum field theory of elementary particles. During the last three decades, he has worked on Global Change Science, including the physics, chemistry and biology of greenhouse gases and ozone depleting compounds. He is a professor of physics at Portland State University.

== Selected publications ==
=== Scientific papers, books and articles ===
M.A.K.Khalil. Global Climate Change and Human Life, J. Wiley & Sons, UK., 2022. ISBN 9780470665787

M.A.K. Khalil. Non-CO_{2} greenhouse gases in the atmosphere. Annual Review of Energy/Environment, Annual Reviews, 1999, Vol. 24: 245–261, 1999.

M.A.K.Khalil. Earth’s atmosphere. Encyclopedia of Geochemistry, Encyclopedia of Earth Sciences Series, C.P. Marshall and R.W. Fairbridge, Editors, Kluwer Academic Publishers, p. 143–145, 1999.

M.A.K. Khalil, R.A. Rasmussen, M.J. Shearer, R.W. Dalluge, L.X. Ren, and C.-L. Duan; Measurements of methane emissions from rice fields in China. J. Geophys. Res., 103(D19): 25,181–25,210, 1998.

M.A.K. Khalil, R.A. Rasmussen, M.J. Shearer, Z.-L. Chen, H. Yao, and Y. Jun; Emissions of methane, nitrous oxide, and other trace gases from rice fields in China. J. Geophys. Res., 103(D19): 25,241–25,250, 1998.

M.A.K. Khalil, M.J. Shearer, and R.A.Rasmussen, Atmospheric methane over the last century.World Resource Review, 8(4): 481–492, 1996.

Y. Lu and M.A.K. Khalil. The distribution of solar radiation in the Earth’s atmosphere: The effects of ozone, aerosols, and clouds. Chemosphere, 32(4): 739–758, 1996.

M.A.K. Khalil. Greenhouse gases in the earth’s atmosphere. Encyclopedia of Environmental Biology, Volume 2, W.A. Nirenberg, Editor, Academic Press, Florida, p. 251–265, 1995.

M.A.K. Khalil and R.A. Rasmussen. The global sources of nitrous oxide. J. Geophys. Res., 97(D13):14651-14660, 1992.

R.M. MacKay and M.A.K. Khalil; Theory and development of a one-dimensional time-dependent radiative convective climate model. Chemosphere, 22(3–4):383–417, 1991.

M. A. K. Khalil and F. P. Moraes. Linear least squares method for time series analysis with an application to a methane time series. Journal of the Air and Waste Management Association, 45, Jan 1995.

=== Bibliography ===
- Atmospheric Methane by Mohammad Aslam Khan Khalil (1993, 2000)

== See also ==
- Atmospheric Physics
- Atmospheric Chemistry
