= Government Islamia College, Chiniot =

College in Chiniot, Punjab, Pakistan

Government Islamia College Chiniot is the largest educational institute in Chiniot, Pakistan, situated in the heart of city.

== History ==
Anjuman Islamia, the operating name of Sheikh Brothers, is a service organization established in 1895 to spread knowledge everywhere in the Muslim world. For the people of Chiniot, the Islamia School was built by Anjuman Islamia in 1901, in the shade of great towers of Badshahi Mosque, Chiniot. Later on, Sheikh Brothers spent 5 lakhs rupees to promote the school to a college status.

Anjuman Islamia established Government Islamia College on 26 September 1954, to intermediate level classes.

Government Islamia College's 22-acre campus is located on the main Faisalabad road. The campus includes the Iqbal library, Quaid-e-Azam hostel and a sports ground.

== Affiliation ==
Government Islamia College, Chiniot is affiliated with the Government College University Faisalabad.
