= Aslam Khan (general) =

Pakistani army personnel

Major General Muhammad Aslam Khan HJ HI(M) SI(M)
- Born: 6 April 1923; Peshawar, British India
- Died: January 22, 1994 (aged 70)
- Military career
- Allegiance: British India (1944-47; Pakistan (1947-84)
- Branch: British Indian Army; Pakistan Army
- Service years: 1944–1984
- Rank: Major General
- Conflicts: World War II; Indo-Pakistani War of 1965
- Awards: Hilal-i-Jurat Hilal-i-Imtiaz Sitara-e-Imtiaz

Muhammad Aslam Khan (6 April 1923 – 22 January 1994; Urdu: محمد اسلم خان) was a Major General in the Pakistan Army who served in military and civil health services. He received national awards including the Sitara-e-Imtiaz and Hilal-e-Imtiaz.

== Background and education ==
Known as 'General Sahib', he was born in Peshawar, NWFP, into a family of Pathans belonging to the Akbar Khel sub-caste of the Khalil Mohmand community. He obtained his education from Islamia High School Peshawar, Government College Lahore and then completed MBBS from King Edward's Medical College, Lahore Punjab at the age of 21.

M. Aslam Khan was commissioned before independence of Pakistan in Army Medical Corps of the British Indian Army (14 July 1944) and soon after his commission he was sent to Italy where he served in various medical units and military hospitals during World War II.
