= India Service Medal =

United Kingdom military campaign medal for service in the Second World War

- Obverse and reverse of medal
- Awarded by the Indian Empire
Type	Campaign medal
Eligibility	Indian Forces
Awarded for	Campaign service
Campaign	Second World War 1939–45
Description	Cupro-nickel, 36mm diameter
Clasps	None

Statistics
Established	6 June 1946
Total awarded	220,000
Related	Defence Medal
- Ribbon bar

The India Service Medal 1939–1945 was a campaign medal of the Commonwealth. It was awarded to Indian Forces for three years of non-operational service in India during the Second World War.

== Eligibility ==
The medal was instituted on 6 June 1946.

It was awarded to Indian Forces, including Reserve, State and Women's forces, for at least three years of non-operational service in India between 3 September 1939 and 2 September 1945. It was issued in addition to, and worn immediately after, British campaign World War II medals.

Approximately 220,000 medals were issued.

== Description ==
- It is a circular, cupro-nickel medal, 36mm diameter.
- The obverse has the crowned effigy of King George VI facing left, with the legend "GEORGIVS VI D:G:BR:OMN:REX ET INDIAE IMP." (George VI by the grace of God King of Great Britain and Emperor of India).
- The reverse shows a relief map of India and the words "INDIA" above and "1939–45" below.
- The medal was awarded unnamed.
- The ribbon represented the colours of the Order of the Star of India and the Order of the Indian Empire.

== Clasps ==
There are no clasps for this medal.
