= Pakistan Medal =

Pakistan Medal تمغہِ پاکستان
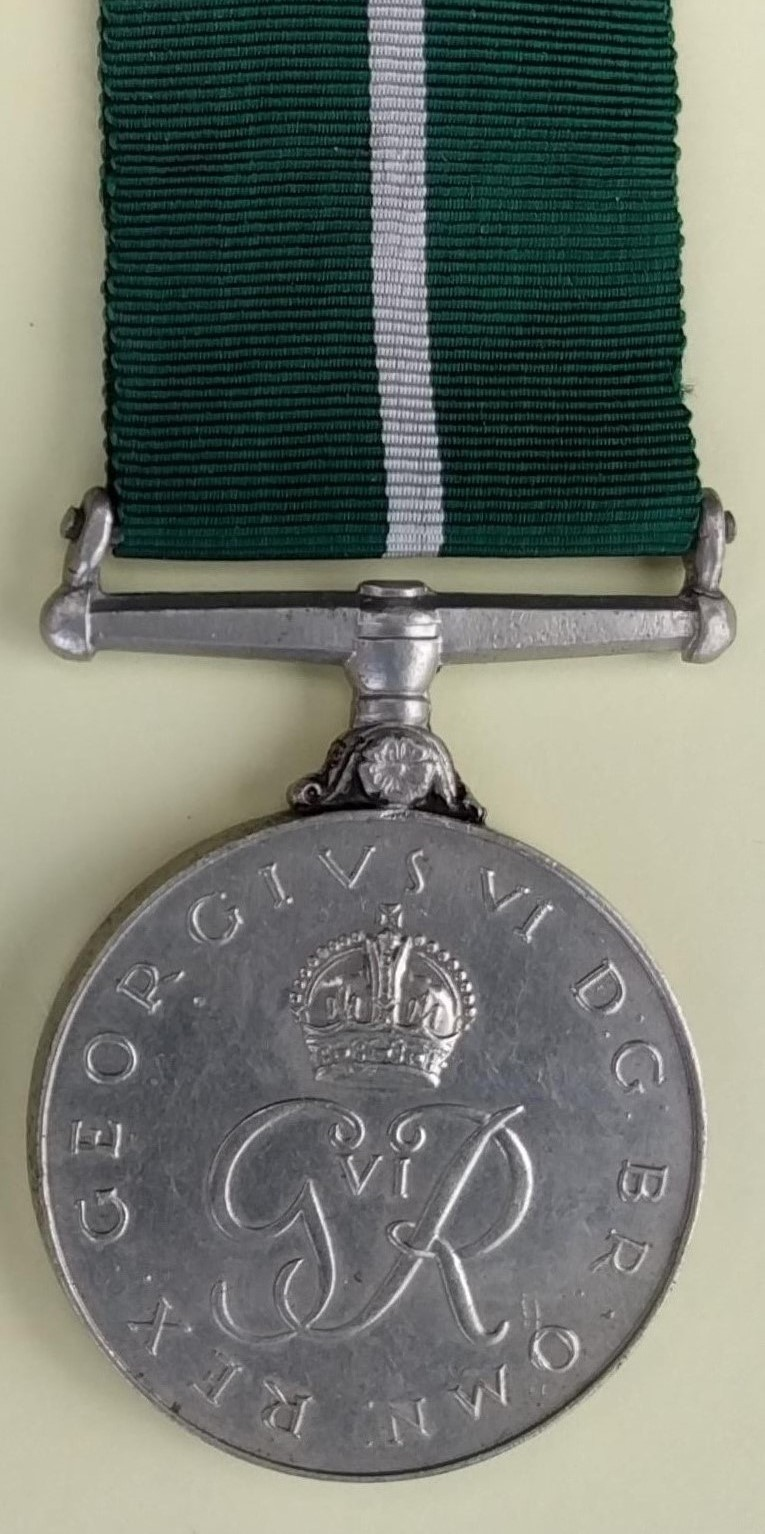
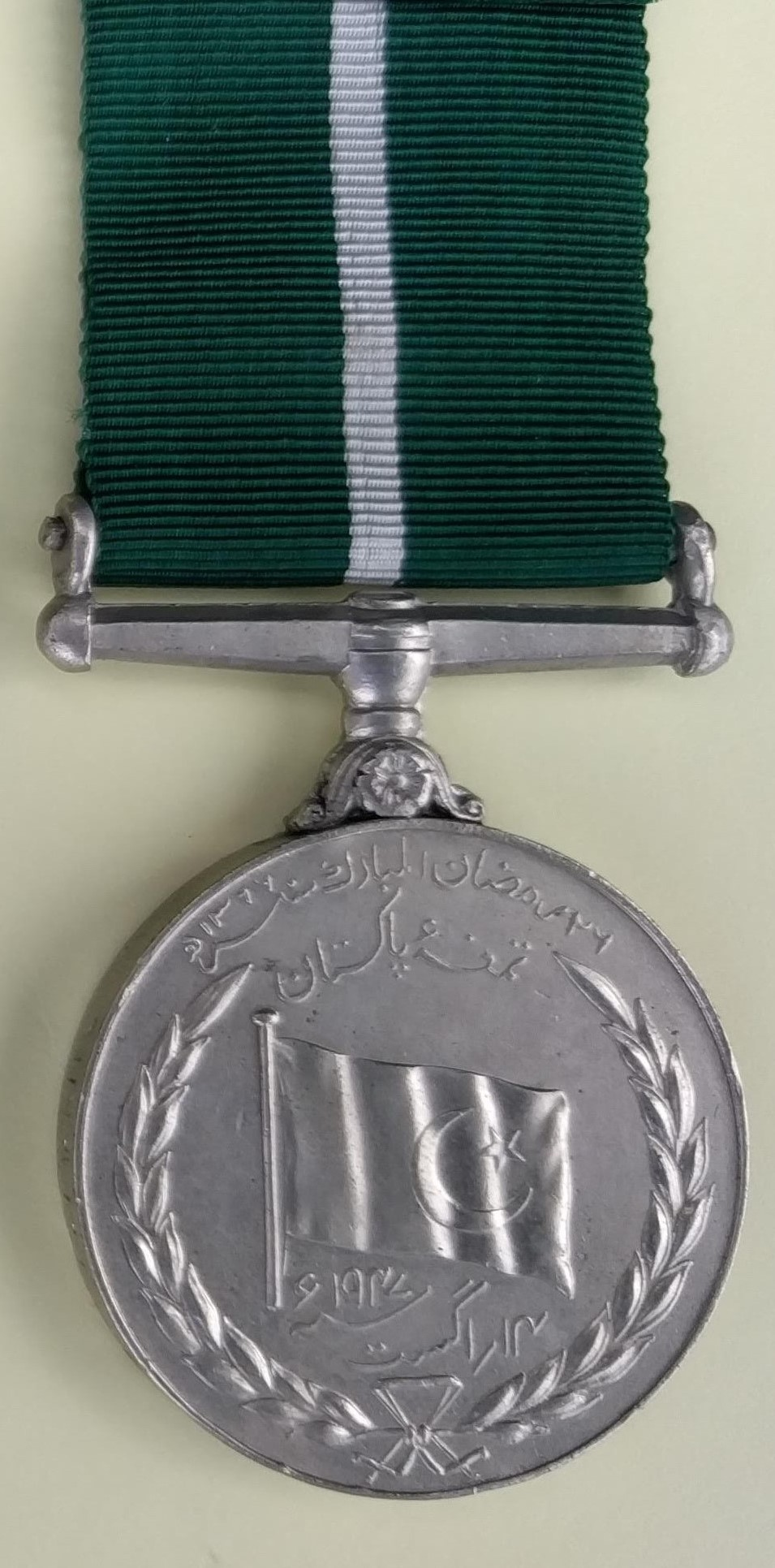
- Obverse and reverse of the medal
- Type: Commemorative medal
- Awarded for: Creation of Pakistan in August 1947
- Description: The medal is made from cupro-nickel
- Presented by: Dominion of Pakistan
- Established: 1949
- Ribbon bar

Precedence
- Next (higher): Indian Independence Medal (United Kingdom); 40-year Service Medal (Pakistan)
- Next (lower): Ceylon Armed Services Inauguration Medal (United Kingdom); Republic Medal 1956 (Pakistan)

The Pakistan Medal (Urdu: تمغہِ پاکستان, romanized: Tamgha-e-Pakistan) was established by King George VI in 1949 as a commemorative medal. The medal commemorates service during the period just before and after the creation of the independent Dominion of Pakistan on 14 August 1947. Most recipients were members of the armed forces of Pakistan, including attached British personnel.

The medal is made of cupronickel and is 1.4 in (36 mm) in diameter. The obverse has the Royal cypher of King George VI surrounded by the inscription GEORGIVS VI D:G:BR:OMN:REX. The reverse shows the flag of Pakistan surrounded by a wreath, with inscriptions in Urdu above and below. The 1.25 in (32 mm) ribbon is dark green with a narrow central stripe of white, the colours of the flag of Pakistan. The name and details of the recipient were impressed on the edge of the medal.

== See also ==
- Awards and decorations of the Pakistan Armed Forces
- Indian Independence Medal
