= Chak 521 EB =

Chak No 521/E.B
- Village
- Location within Pakistan
- Coordinates: 30°10′N 72°41′E
- Country: Pakistan
- Province: Punjab
- Elevation: 133 m (436 ft)

Population (2018)
  - Total: 3,000
- Time zone: UTC+5 (PST)
- Calling code: 067

Chak No 521/E.B is a village in Burewala, District Vehari, South Punjab, Pakistan.

Number of Schools: 3

School Names:

1: Govt Middle School for Boys 521/E.B

2: Govt Primary School for Girls 521/E.B

3: The TCF School

Number of Houses: 350
