= Chak 291 EB =

Chak No. 291/E.B
- Village
- Location within Pakistan
- Coordinates: 30.102486°N 72.846297°E
- Country: Pakistan
- Province: Punjab
- Region/Division: Multan
- District: Vehari District
- Tehsil: Burewala
- Union Council: 75
- Population: 23,094
- Time zone: UTC+5 (PST)
- Area code: +92 (0) 67
- Website: www.tmaburewala.com

Religions in Chak No. 291/E.B
| Religions | Percent |
| Islam | 99.5% |
| Christian | 0.5% |

Chak No. 291/E.B is a village of Burewala, Punjab, Pakistan situated on Jamlera Road. It is located at coordinate 30.102486N 72.846297E about 20 km away from the main city of Burewala. This village is 54 km away from district Vehari, and about 150 km away from its division Multan. It is a quite large village of Burewala Tehsil. It is known as Progressive Village in Tehsil Burewala. Daily, youth of many other villages went here for playing Floodlight Football Matches and also Kabaddi Matches.

== Language ==
As per the national census of 1998 Punjabi language is the main language of Chak No. 291/E.B spoken by 94% population.

== Facilities ==
- Govt. Boys High School
- Govt. Girls High School
- Govt. Hospital
- Union Council
- Post Office
- Religious Educational Institutions
- Private Schools (3 nos.)
- Jamal Agriculture Corporation
- Floodlight Football Ground

== Castes ==
- ARAIN
- BHATTI
- Jutt
- Rajput
- Mahaar
- Others Kumhar, Julaha, Lohar, Cobbler and Dogar

== Religion ==
- Islam almost 99.5% followers
- Christian almost 0.5% followers
- Five Mosques
- One Church

== Agriculture ==
Mostly peoples having agriculture business here which is the backbone of the economy.

=== Main Crops ===
- Cotton
- Wheat
- Corn
- Rice
- Sugarcane

=== Vegetables ===
turnip, carrot, broad beans, eggplant, tomato, cucumber, onion, garlic, Red Chili, potato, Momordica charantia, pumpkin, white radish and spinach

=== Fruits ===
Mangoes, Oranges, Guava, Watermelon, Lemons, Jamun, Pomegranate, Peaches, Grewia asiatica

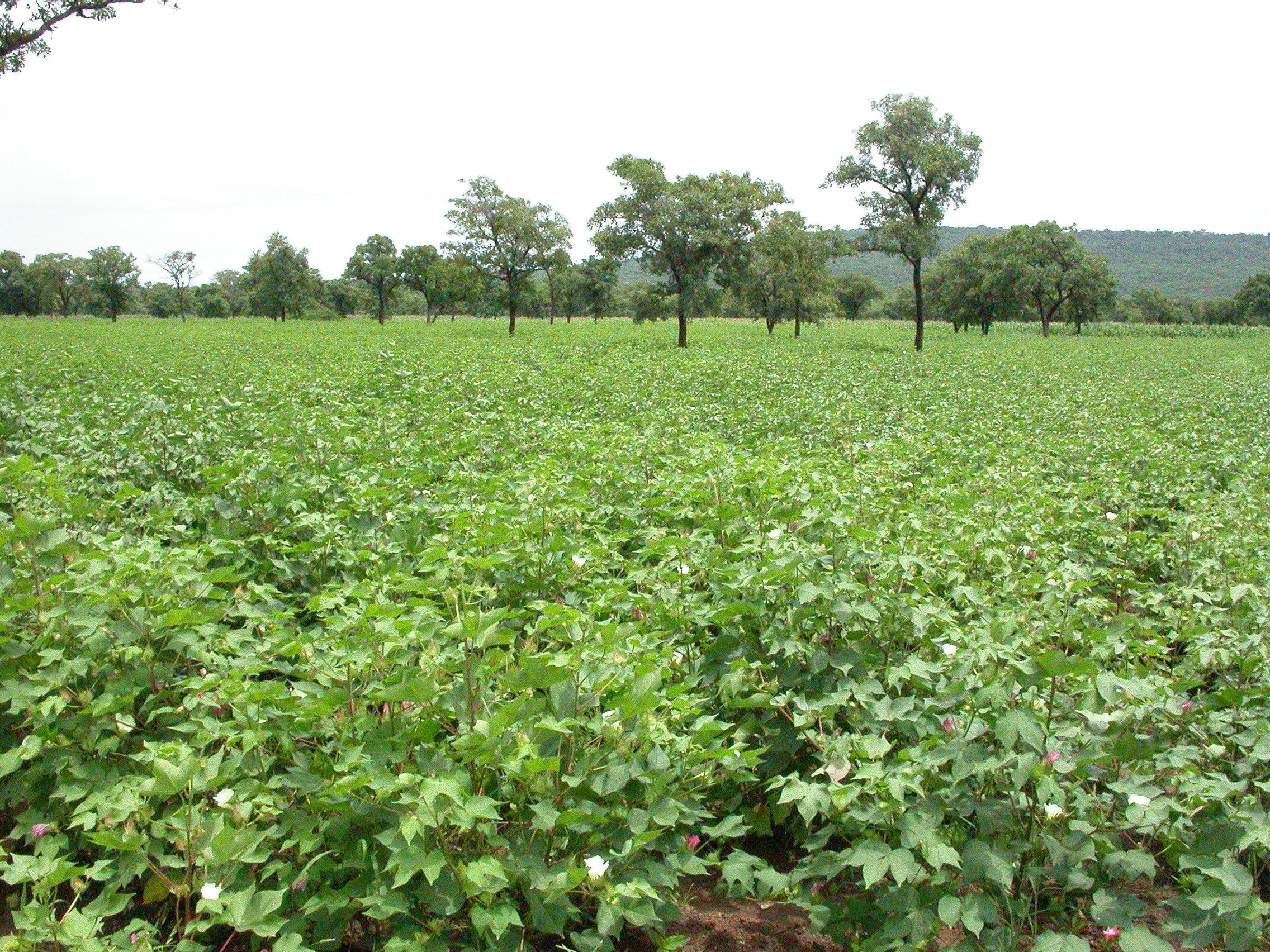
Cotton Fields-کپاس

== Geography and climate ==
The village of Chak No. 291/E.B is located in Punjab. The area around the village is a flat, alluvial plain and is ideal for agriculture, with many cotton, wheat and corn fields. There is a canal that cut across the 291/E.B village, providing water from for agriculture. This makes the land very fertile. However, land close to the Sutleg river is usually flooded in the monsoon season.

291/E.B features an arid climate with very hot summers and mild winters. The village witnesses some of the most extreme weather in the country.

Chak No. 291/E.B

Climate chart (precipitation, max. and min. temperature)
| J | F | M | A | M | J | J | A | S | O | N | D |
| 7.2 21 5 | 9.5 23 8 | 20 29 14 | 13 36 20 | 9.8 40 24 | 12 42 29 | 61 39 29 | 33 38 28 | 11 37 25 | 1.7 35 18 | 2.3 29 11 | 6.9 23 6 |
- █ Average max. and min. temperatures in °C
- █ Precipitation totals in mm
Imperial conversion
| J | F | M | A | M | J | J | A | S | O | N | D |
| 0.3 70 40 | 0.4 74 46 | 0.8 83 56 | 0.5 96 67 | 0.4 105 76 | 0.5 108 83 | 2.4 103 84 | 1.3 100 82 | 0.4 99 77 | 0.1 94 65 | 0.1 83 52 | 0.3 73 42 |
- █ Average max. and min. temperatures in °F
- █ Precipitation totals in inches

Climate data for Chak No. 291/E.B
| Month | Jan | Feb | Mar | Apr | May | Jun | Jul | Aug | Sep | Oct | Nov | Dec | Year |
|---|---|---|---|---|---|---|---|---|---|---|---|---|---|
| Record high °C (°F) | 28.3 (82.9) | 32.0 (89.6) | 39.0 (102.2) | 45.0 (113.0) | 48.9 (120.0) | 52.0 (125.6) | 52.2 (126.0) | 45.0 (113.0) | 42.5 (108.5) | 40.6 (105.1) | 36.0 (96.8) | 29.0 (84.2) | 52.2 (126.0) |
| Mean daily maximum °C (°F) | 21.0 (69.8) | 23.2 (73.8) | 28.5 (83.3) | 35.5 (95.9) | 40.4 (104.7) | 42.3 (108.1) | 39.2 (102.6) | 38.0 (100.4) | 37.2 (99.0) | 34.6 (94.3) | 28.5 (83.3) | 22.7 (72.9) | 32.6 (90.7) |
| Daily mean °C (°F) | 12.7 (54.9) | 15.4 (59.7) | 21.0 (69.8) | 27.5 (81.5) | 32.4 (90.3) | 35.5 (95.9) | 33.9 (93.0) | 33.0 (91.4) | 31.0 (87.8) | 26.4 (79.5) | 19.7 (67.5) | 14.1 (57.4) | 25.2 (77.4) |
| Mean daily minimum °C (°F) | 4.5 (40.1) | 7.6 (45.7) | 13.5 (56.3) | 19.5 (67.1) | 24.4 (75.9) | 28.6 (83.5) | 28.7 (83.7) | 28.0 (82.4) | 24.9 (76.8) | 18.2 (64.8) | 10.9 (51.6) | 5.5 (41.9) | 17.9 (64.1) |
| Record low °C (°F) | −3.9 (25.0) | −2.0 (28.4) | 3.3 (37.9) | 9.4 (48.9) | 13.5 (56.3) | 20.0 (68.0) | 21.1 (70.0) | 21.1 (70.0) | 16.7 (62.1) | 8.9 (48.0) | 0.6 (33.1) | −1.1 (30.0) | −3.9 (25.0) |
| Average precipitation mm (inches) | 7.2 (0.28) | 9.5 (0.37) | 19.5 (0.77) | 12.9 (0.51) | 9.8 (0.39) | 12.3 (0.48) | 61.3 (2.41) | 32.6 (1.28) | 10.8 (0.43) | 1.7 (0.07) | 2.3 (0.09) | 6.9 (0.27) | 186.8 (7.35) |
| Mean monthly sunshine hours | 222.3 | 211.6 | 250.8 | 273.3 | 293.5 | 266.8 | 265.0 | 277.6 | 277.6 | 274.9 | 255.0 | 229.2 | 3,097.6 |
Source: NOAA (1961–1990)

== Gallery ==
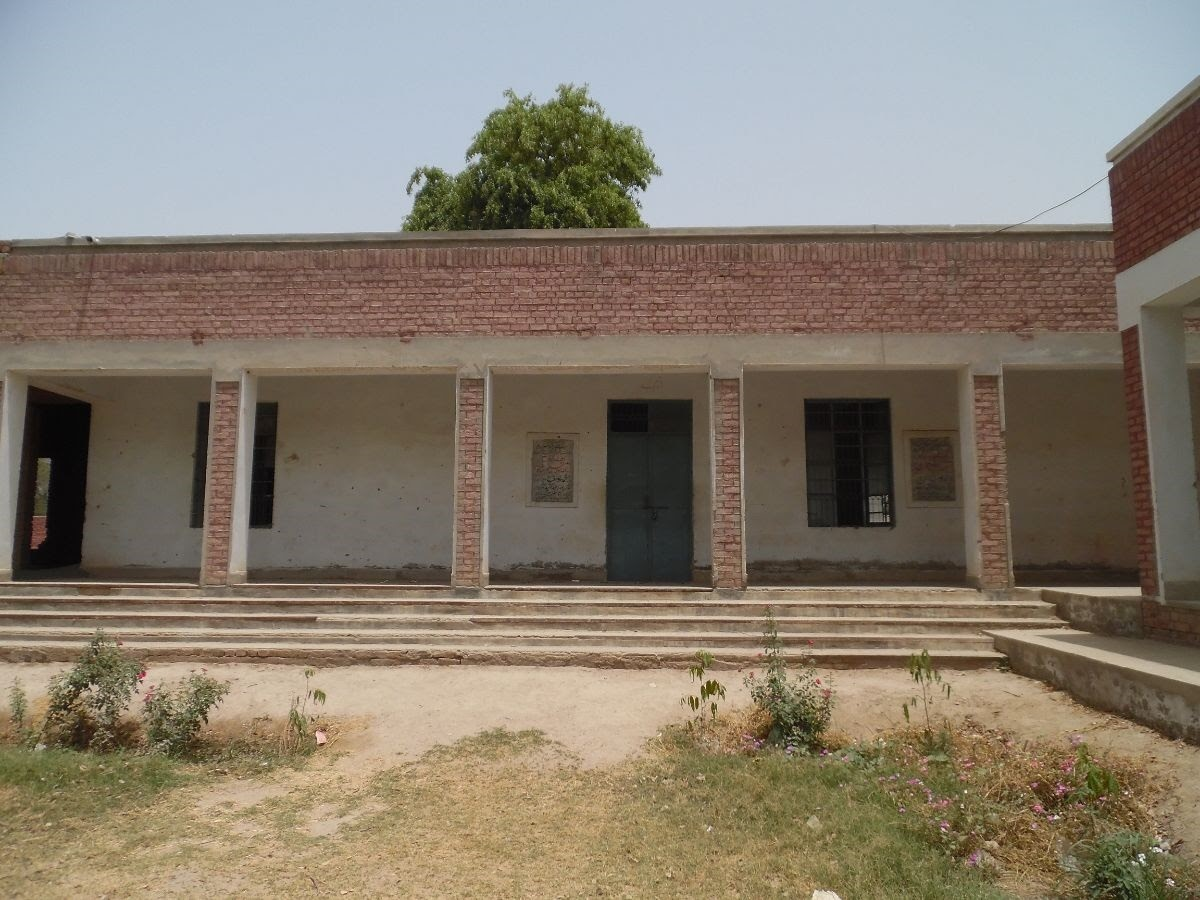
Block govt boys high school

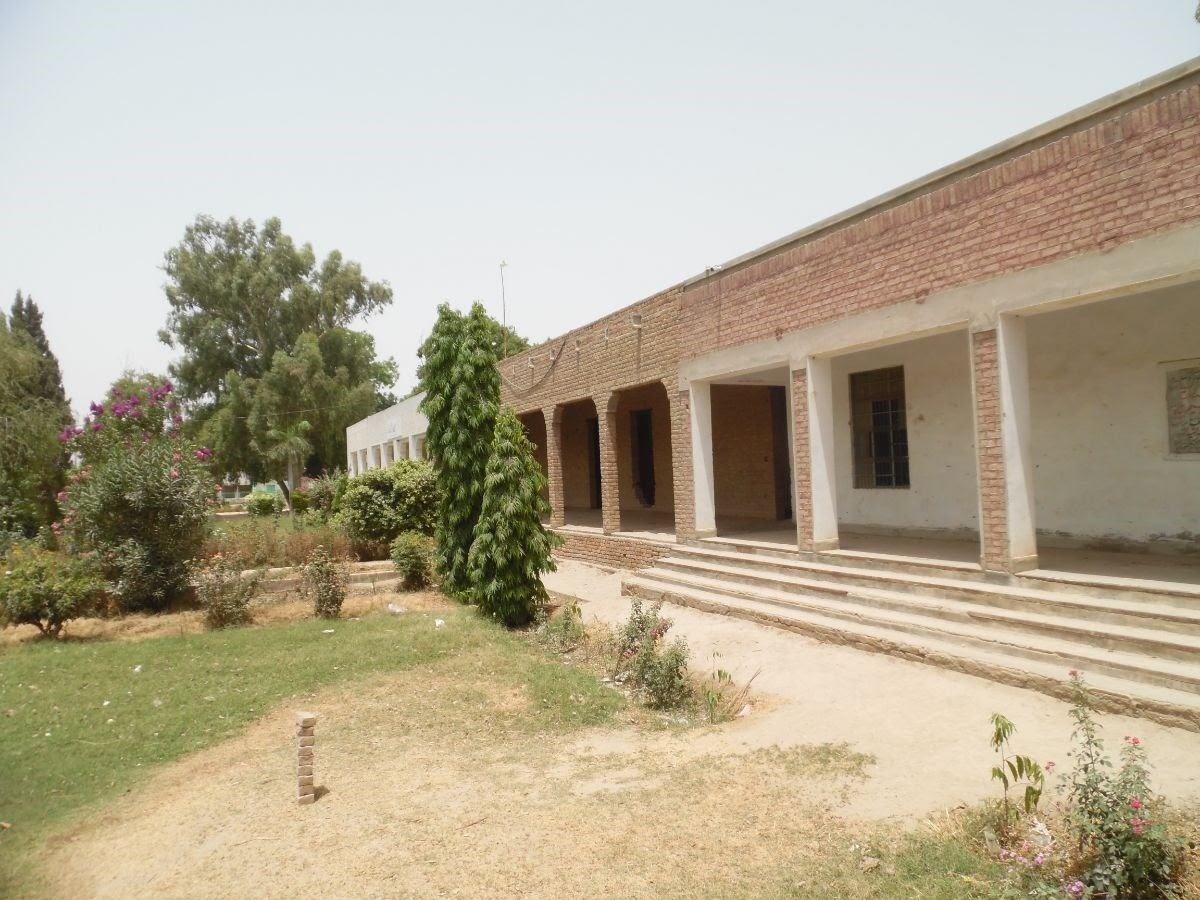
Block govt boys high school

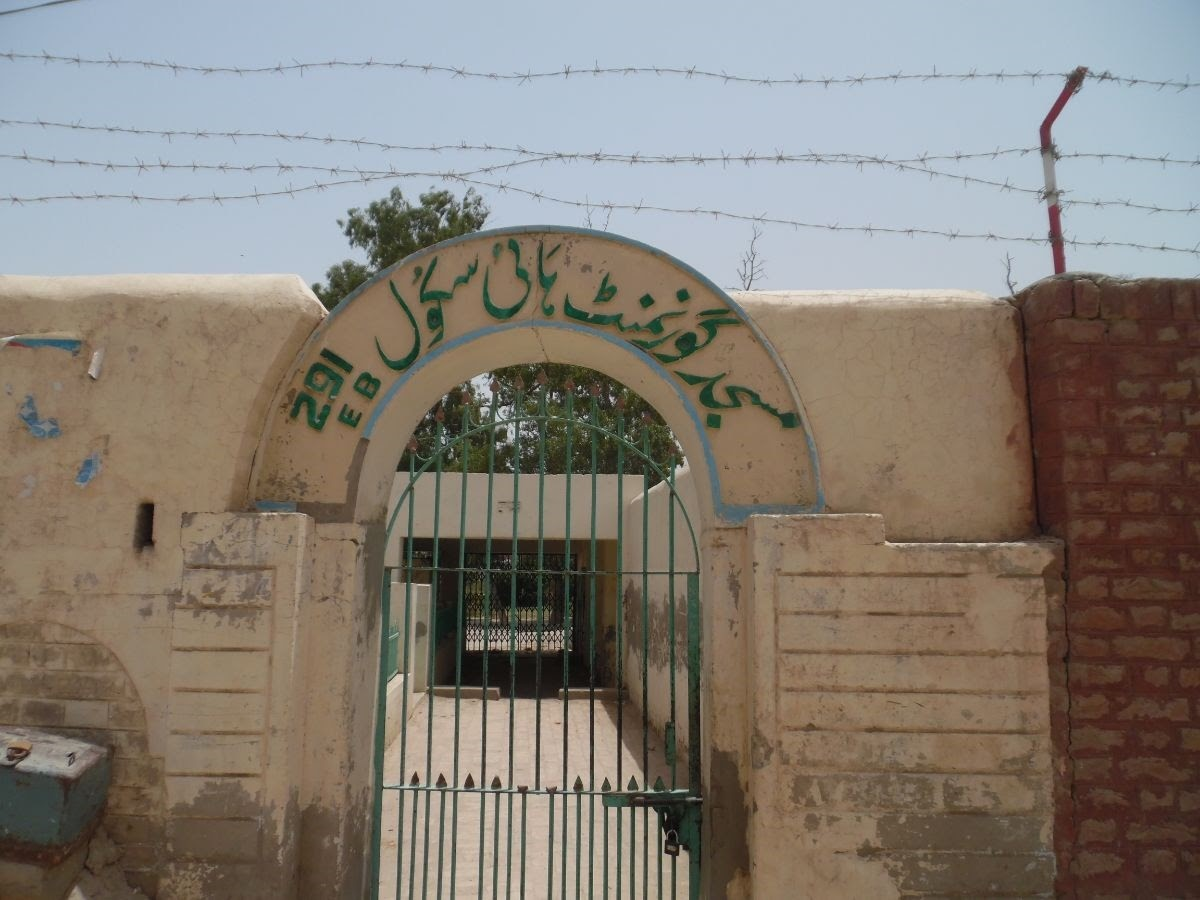
Boys high school (masjid gate)

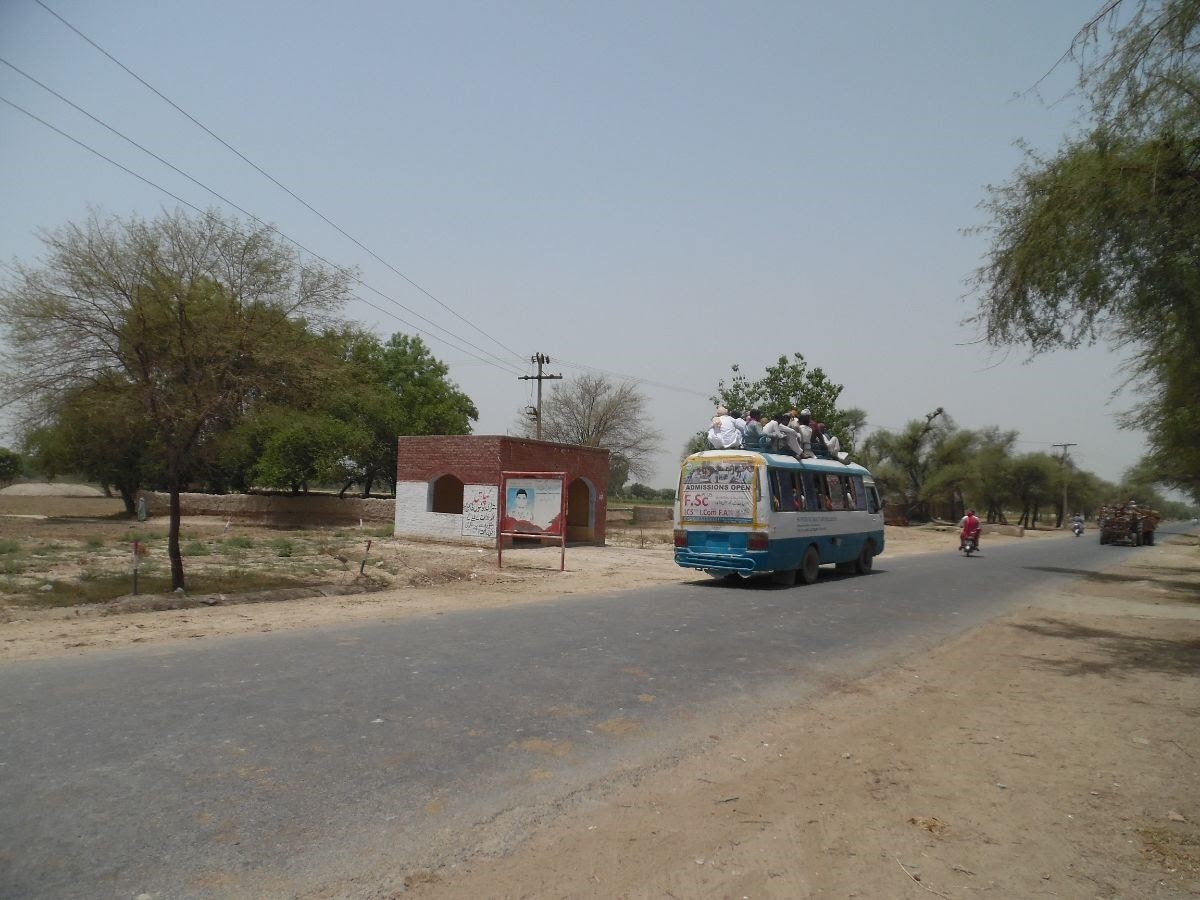
Bus stop

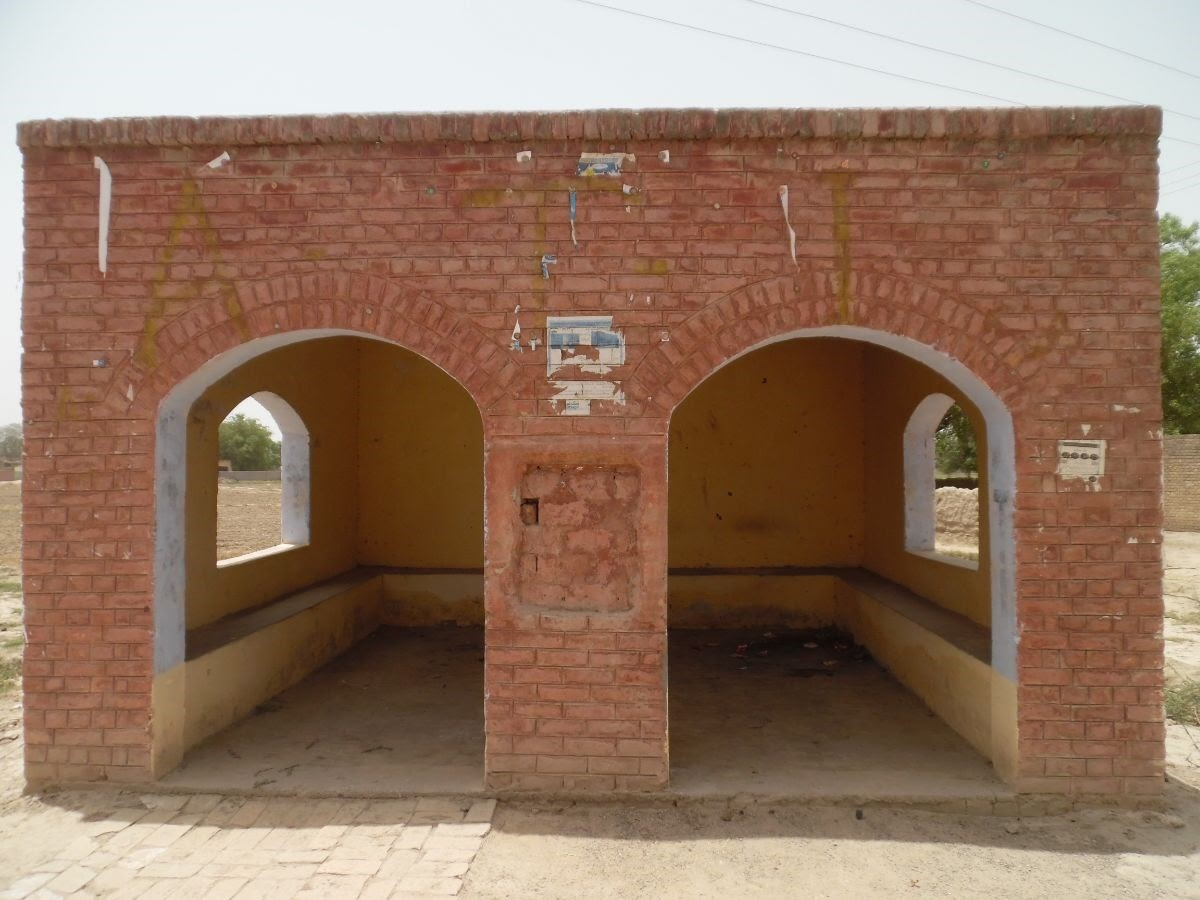
Bus stop room

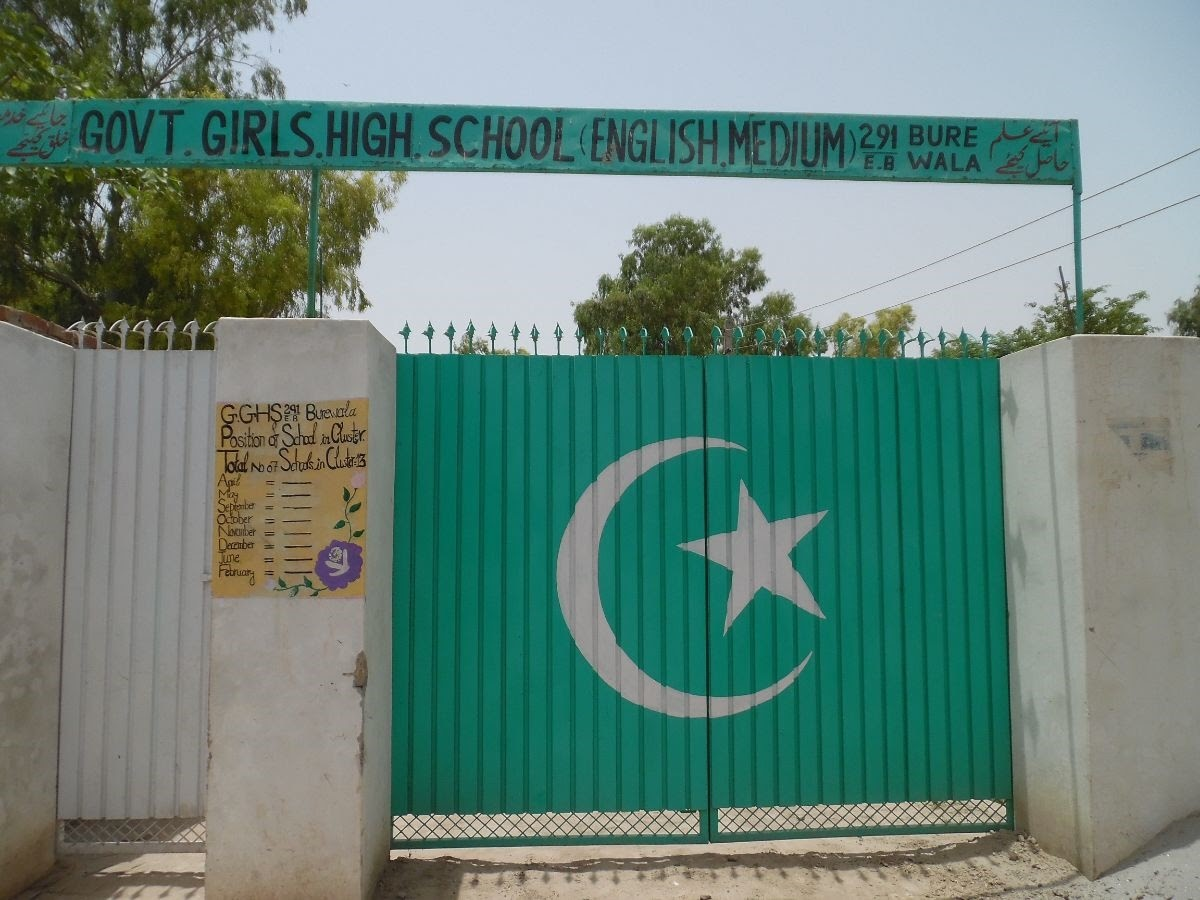
Govt. Girls High School (main gate)

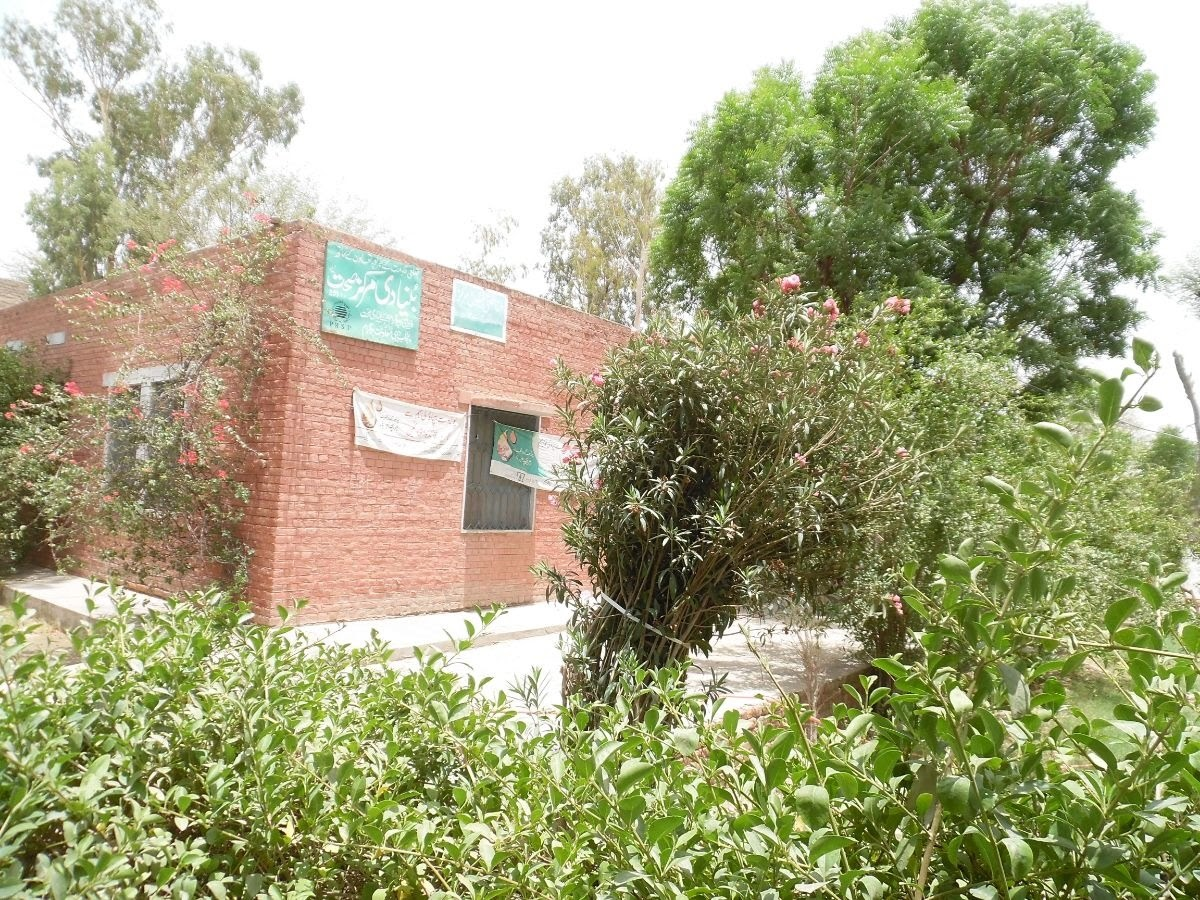
Govt. Hospital building

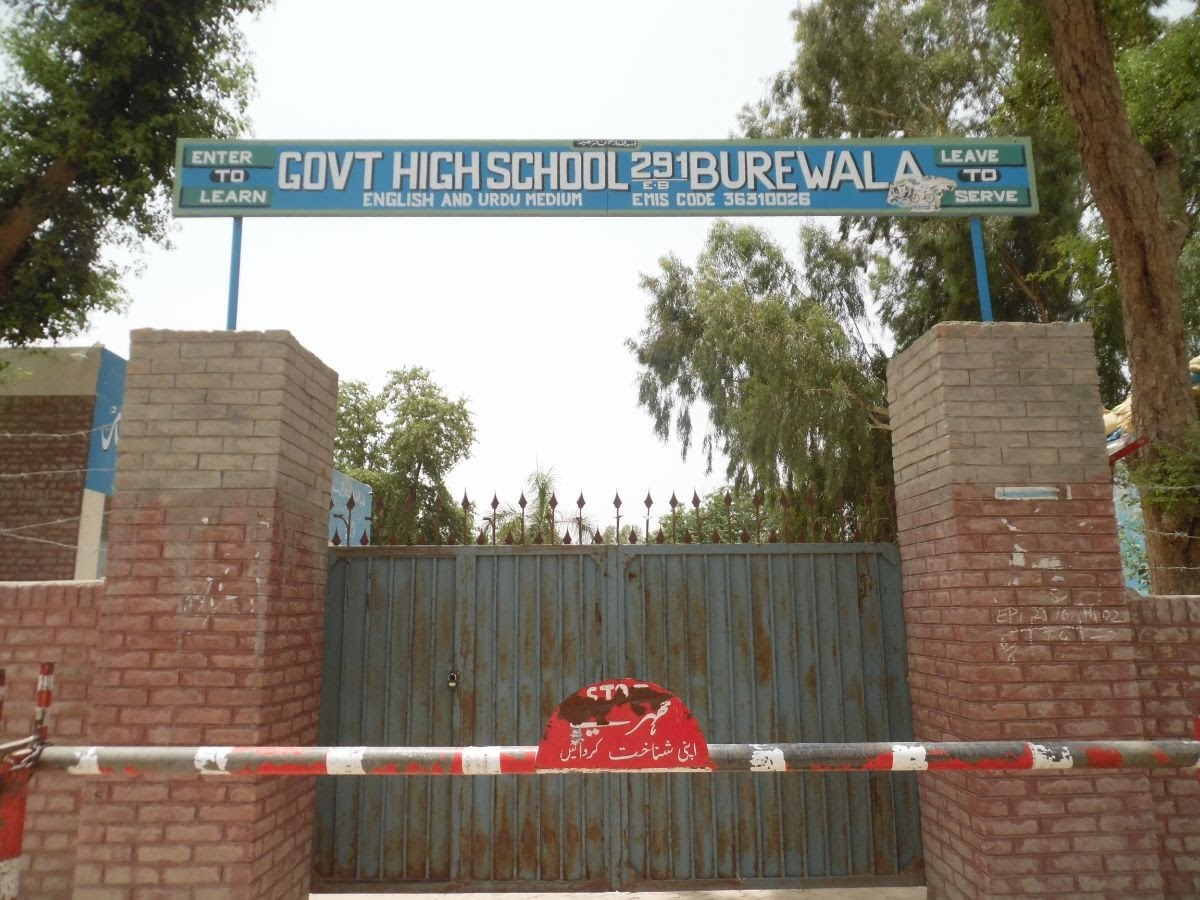
Govt boys high school (main gate)

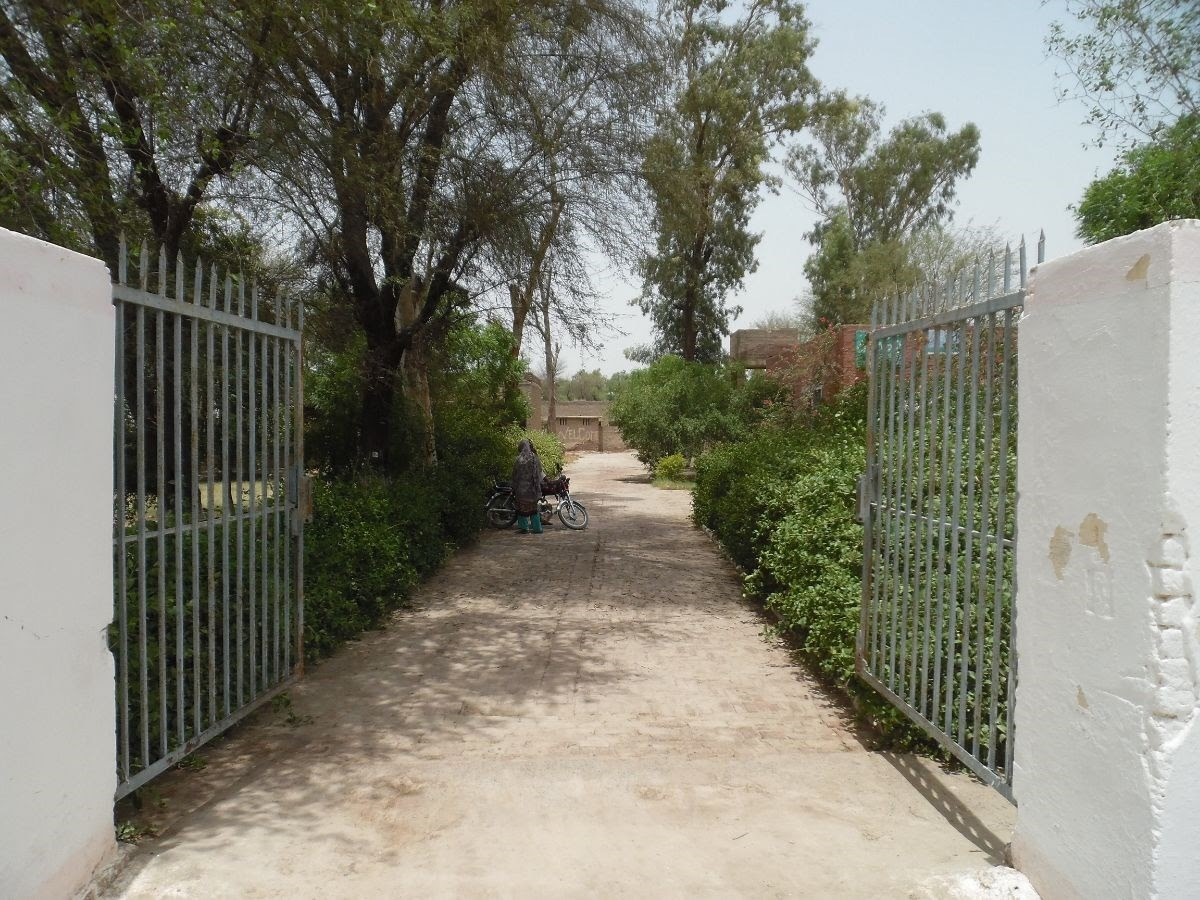
Hospital main gate

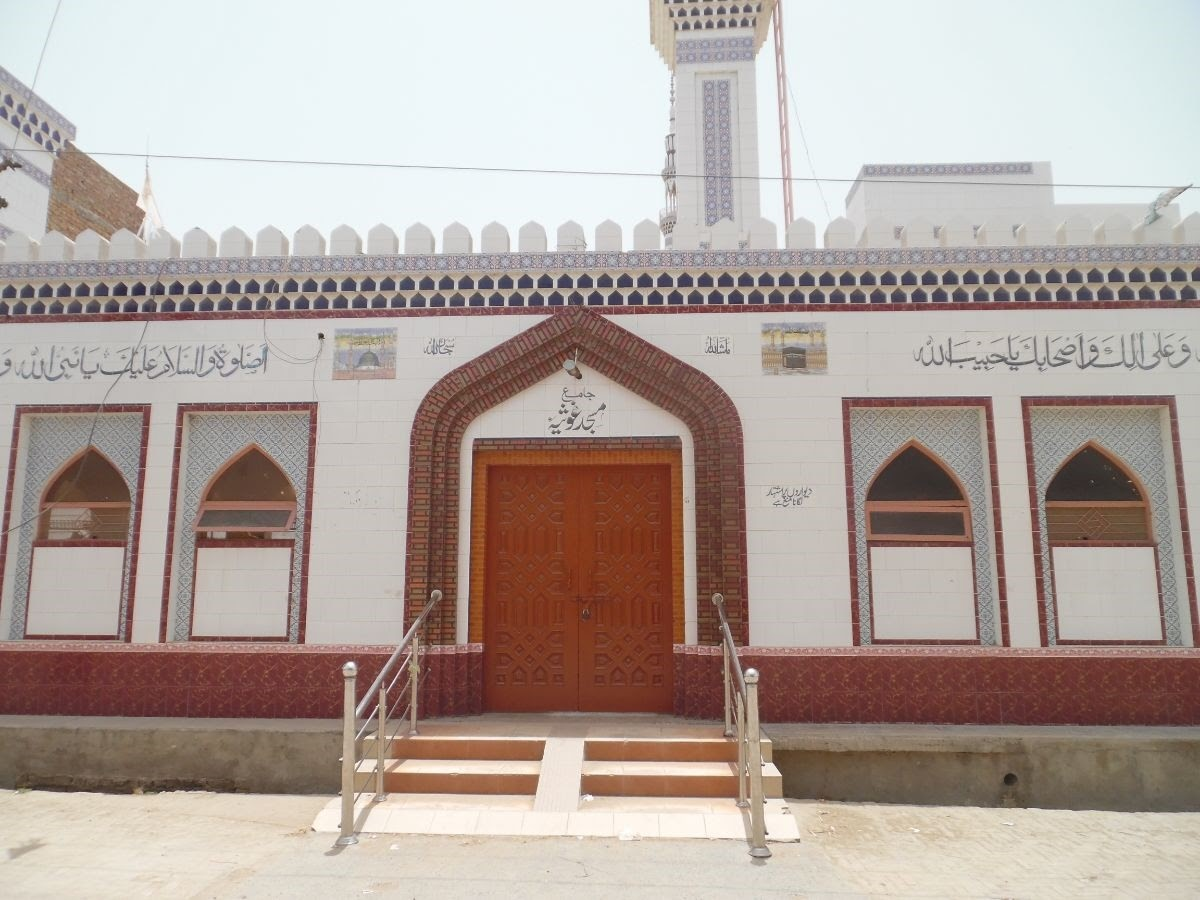
Jamea Masjid

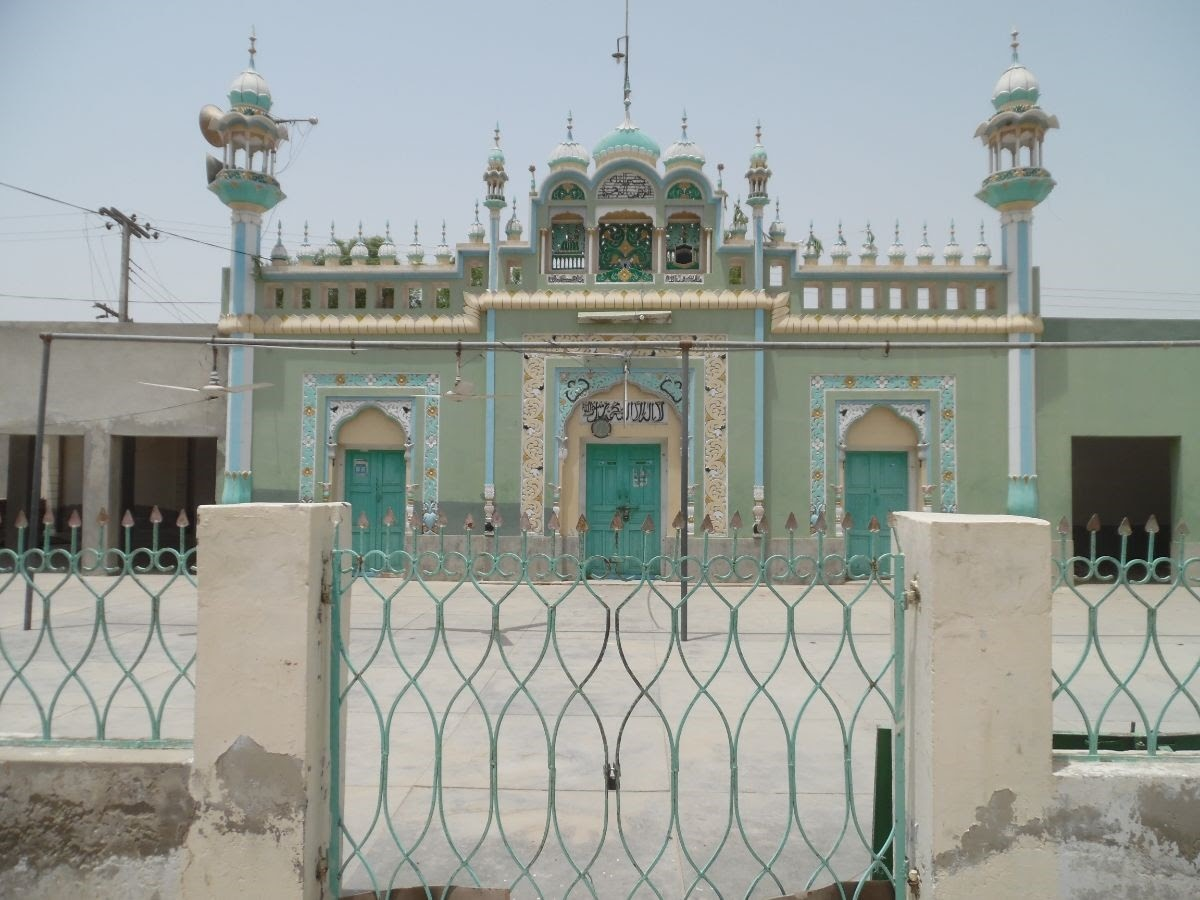
Mosque school

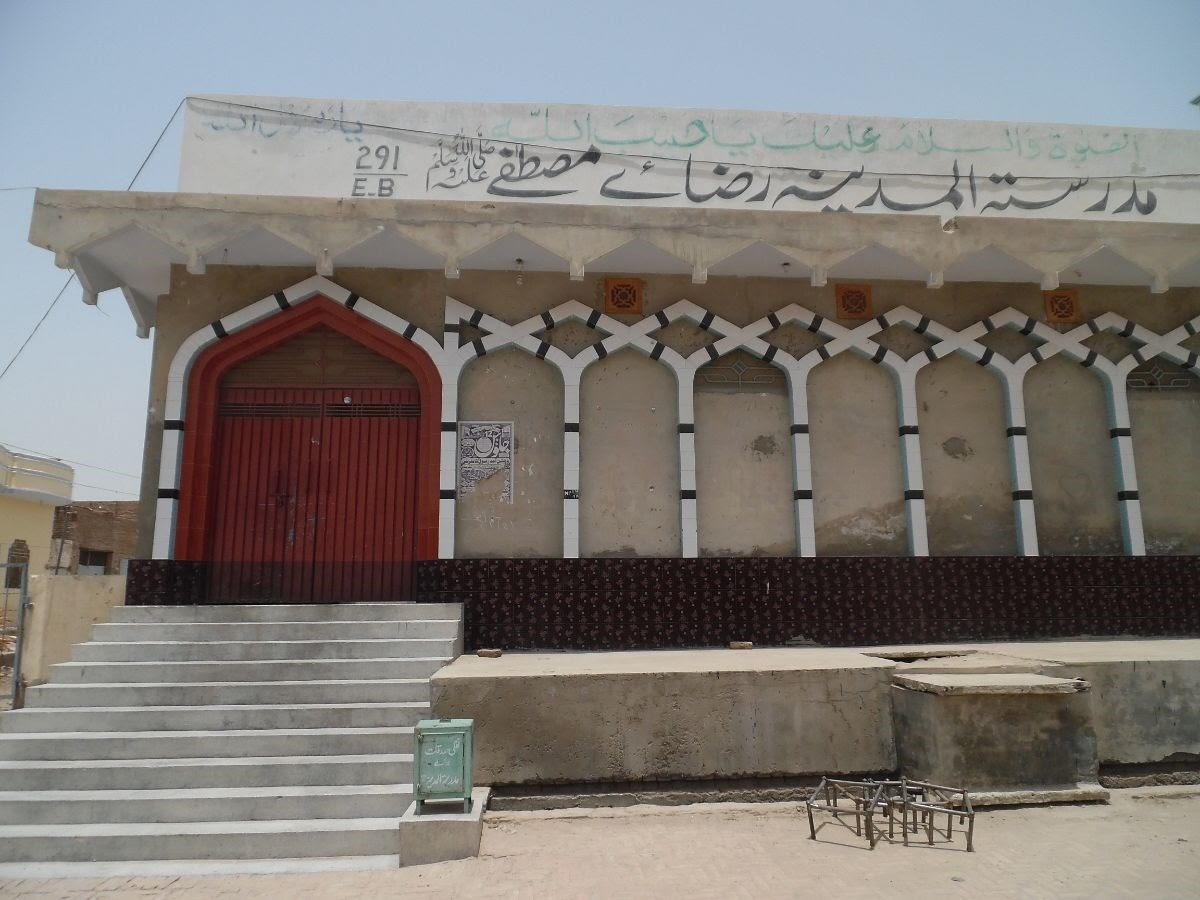
Madrassa Rezae Mustafa

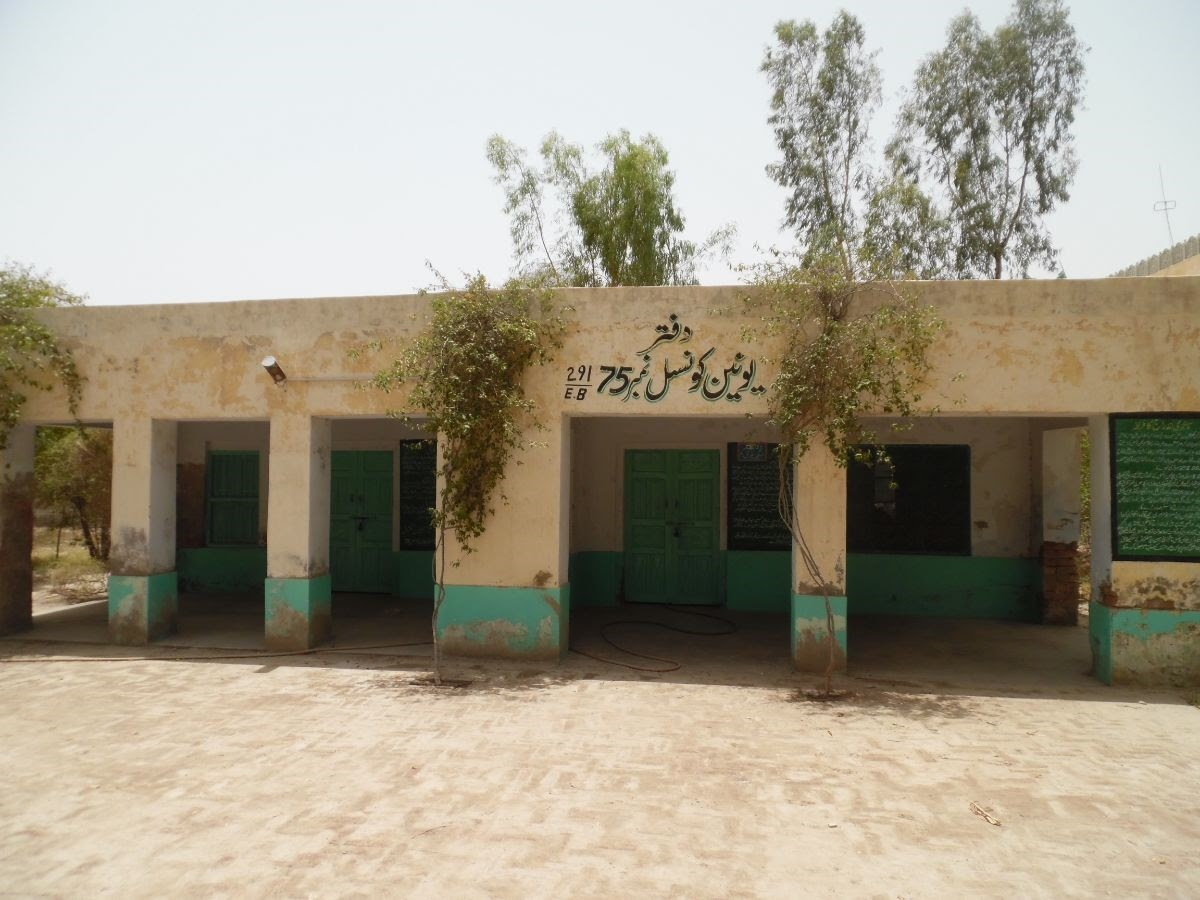
Union Council

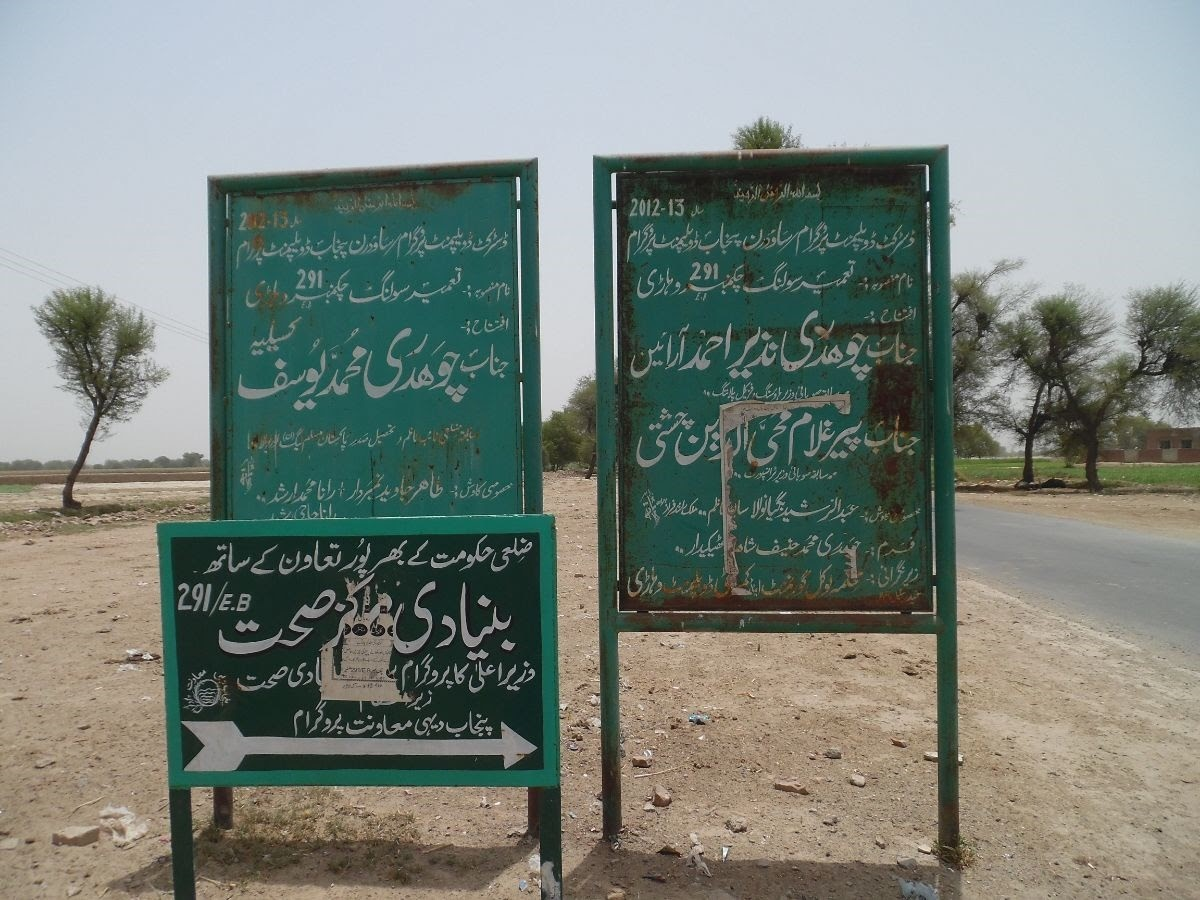
Sign Boards

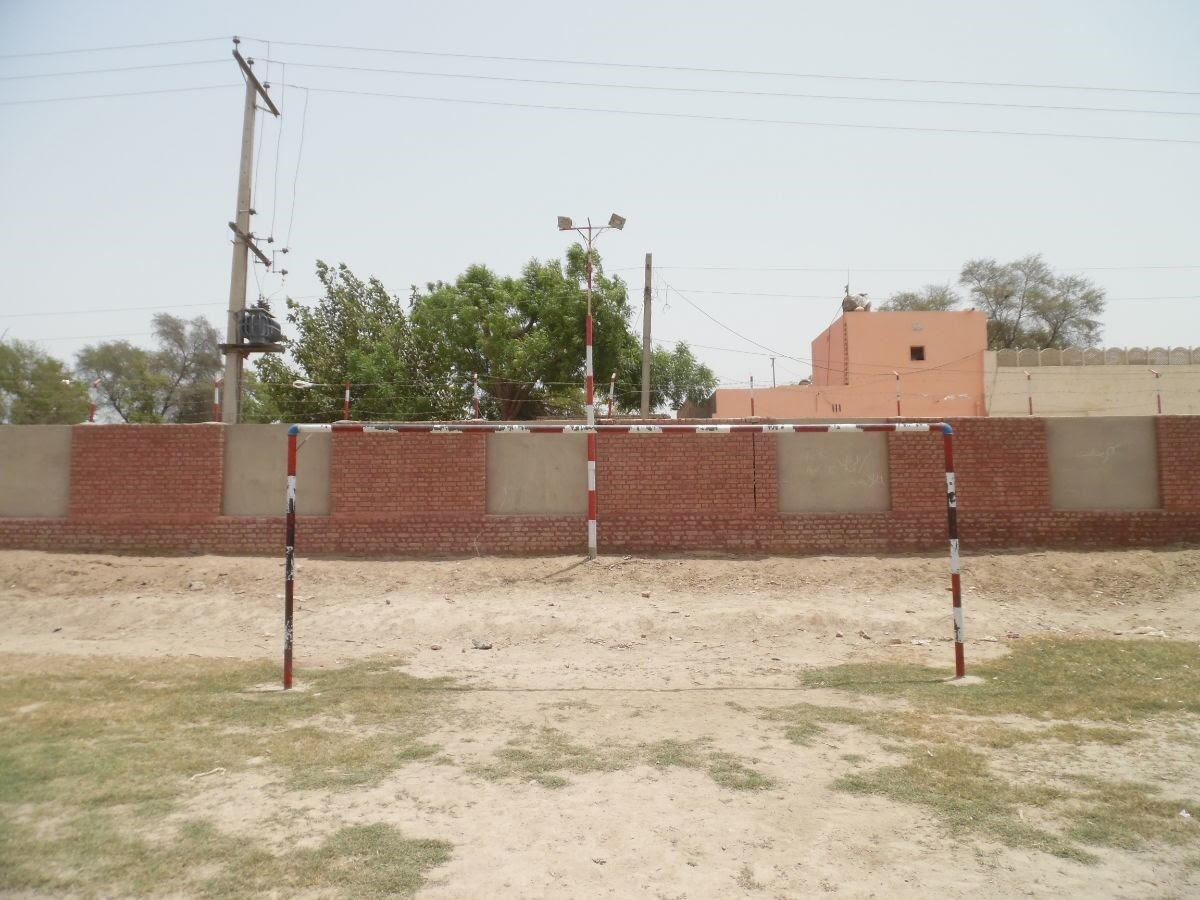
Play ground

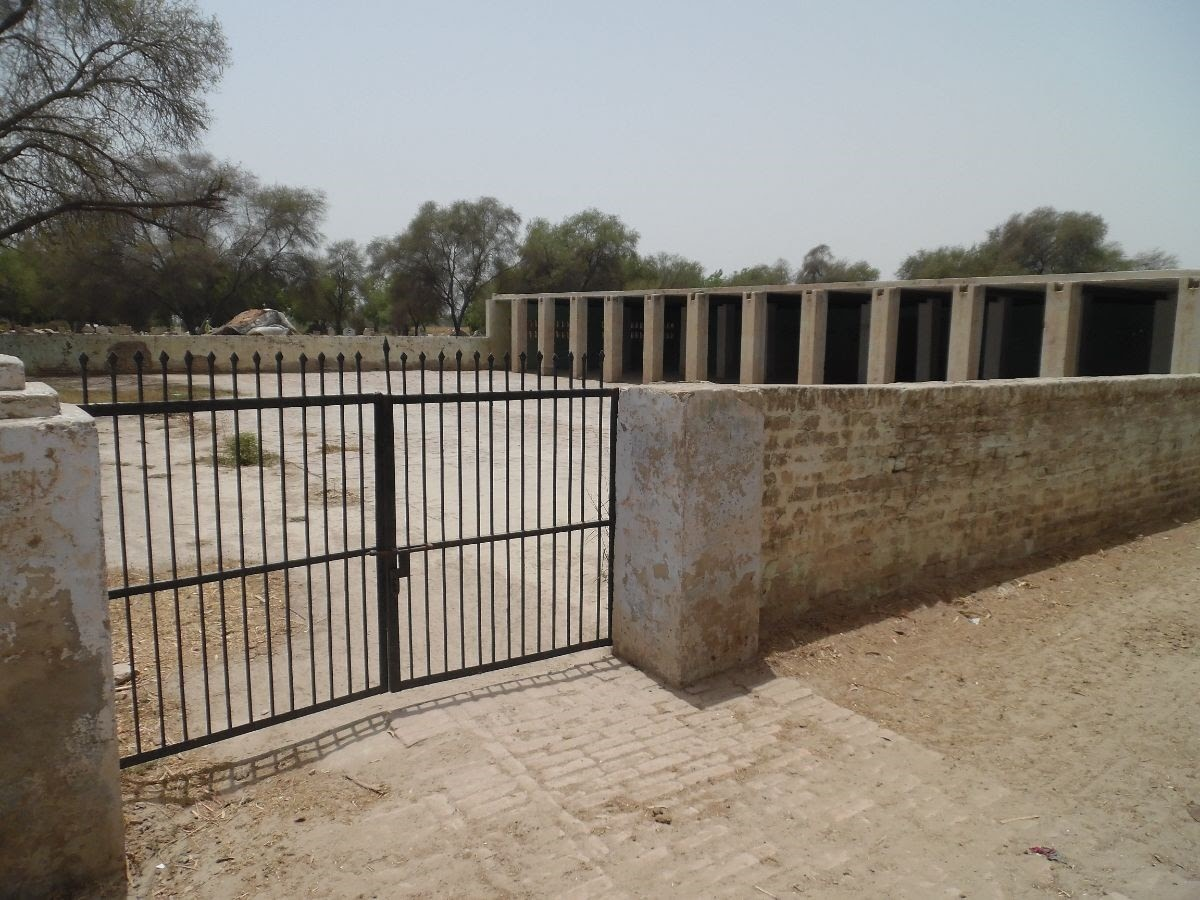
Funeral

== Nearby villages ==
- Chak No. 255/E.B Village of Be-Nazeer Bhutto (Late)
- Chak No. 257/E.B
- Chak No. 289/E.B
- Chak No. 299/E.B
- Chak No. 287/E.B
- Chak No. 269/E.B
- Chak No. 293/E.B
- Chak No. 295/E.B
- Chak No. 297/E.B
- Chak No. 281/E.B
- Chak No. 279/E.B
- Chak No. 283/E.B
- Chak No. 275/E.B
- Chak No. 267/E.B
- Chak No. 265/E.B
- Chak No. 203/E.B
