= Fahad Masood =

Pakistani cricketer (born 1981)

Personal information
- Full name: Fahad Masood
- Born: 14 August 1981 (age 45); Gaggu Mandi, Punjab, Pakistan
- Batting: Right-handed
- Bowling: Right-arm fast-medium
- Role: Bowler

Career statistics
Competition	First-class	List A	Twenty20
Matches	129	75	19
Runs scored	2,142	364	180
Batting average	13.90	13.00	12.00
100s/50s	0/2	0/1	0/1
Top score	66	64	64*
Balls bowled	19,749	3,320	377
Wickets	459	96	24
Bowling average	21.70	29.64	18.91
5 wickets in innings	19	2	0
10 wickets in match	2	0	0
Best bowling	7/27	7/33	4/25
Catches/stumpings	45/–	13/–	5/–
- Source: Cricinfo, 3 May 2026

Fahad Masood (born 14 August 1981) is a Pakistani cricket coach and former cricketer. A right-handed lower-order batsman and right-arm fast-medium bowler, he was born in Gaggu Mandi, Punjab. He played domestic cricket in Pakistan for Lahore, Habib Bank Limited, Zarai Taraqiati Bank Limited and the Agriculture Development Bank of Pakistan, while also representing Lahore Eagles, Lahore Lions, Bahawalpur Stags and Pakistan A.

Masood made his first-class debut in the 1999/00 season. He later made his List A debut for Pakistan Emerging Team against India Emerging Team in the Emerging Team Trophy at Colombo in September 2003, taking 4 wickets for 30 runs and being named player of the match. He made his Twenty20 debut for Lahore Eagles against Sialkot Stallions in the ABN-AMRO Twenty-20 Cup in April 2005.

By 2008, Masood was one of Pakistan's leading domestic bowlers after strong performances in first-class cricket, though he was overlooked for the Pentangular Cup squads. His most notable first-class return came in the 2011–12 Quaid-e-Azam Trophy, when he took 4 for 56 and 6 for 28 against Pakistan International Airlines at Lahore. His career-best match figures were 11 for 80, while his best innings figures were 7 for 27. In one-day cricket, he produced his best spell in March 2012, taking 7 for 33 for Habib Bank Limited against Water and Power Development Authority as the opposition were bowled out for 60. Later that year, he took 6 for 33 against Pakistan International Airlines in the President's Trophy.

Overall, Masood played 129 first-class matches, taking 459 wickets at a bowling average of 21.70, alongside 96 wickets in 75 List A matches and 24 wickets in 19 Twenty20 matches. He also scored 2,142 first-class runs, with a highest score of 66.

After retiring as a player, Masood moved into coaching. The Pakistan Cricket Board named him among its new domestic coaches in 2020, he served as assistant coach of Northern U19 Blues in the 2022 National U19 Cup, and was appointed fielding coach of Pakistan Shaheens for the first four-day match against Bangladesh A in 2024.
