= Burewala Tehsil =

Burewala Tehsil تحصِيل بُورے والا
- Tehsil
- Location of Burewala Tehsil in Punjab, Pakistan
- Country: Pakistan
- Region: (Punjab, Pakistan) Punjab
- District: Vehari
- Capital: Burewala
- Union councils: 32

Area
  - Tehsil: 1,313 km^{2} (507 sq mi)

Population (2023)
  - Tehsil: 1,204,255
  - Urban: 361,664
  - Rural: 842,591
- Time zone: UTC+5 (PST)
  - Summer (DST): UTC+5 (PDT)

Burewala (Punjabi: تحصیل بورے والہ, is an administrative subdivision (tehsil) of Vehari District in the Punjab province of Pakistan. The city of Burewala is the headquarters of the tehsil.

== Administration ==
The tehsil of Burewala is administratively subdivided into 32 Union Councils, these are:

- Chak No.118/E.B
- 118/E.B
- 124/EB
- 148/EB
- 173/EB
- 199/EB
- 223/EB
- 225/EB
- 247/EB
- 257/EB
- 267/EB
- 283/EB
- Chak No. 291/E.B
- Chak No. 293/E.B

Yasinabad

- 305/EB
- 505/EB
- 403/EB
- 425/EB
- 435/EB
- 443/EB Haji Zafar Ali Toor Dera
- 447/EB (Mujahid Colony)
- 457/EB
- 483/EB
- 495/EB
- 465/EB
- 37/WB
- 499/EB
- 521/EB
- Burewala-I
- Burewala-II (B.T.M)
- Burewala-III (Gulshan-i-Rehman)
- Burewala-IV (Housing Scheme)
- Burewala-V (Satellite Town)
- Burewala-VI (Yaqoobabad)
- Dewan Sahib (317/EB)
- Gaggo
- Jamlera
- Saldera
- Sahuka Pakistan
- Sheikh Fazil (98/EB)
- Chak No 545/E.B Balochwala
- Chak No 309/E.B khokharanwala
- Daira Nathay Khan Khokhar
