= Baba Ratan Hindi =

Medieval Muslim saint

Baba Ratan Hindi (Arabic: بابا رتن الهندي; lit. 'Baba Ratan the Indian', name also spelt Rattan), was a figure first mentioned in the 12th-century Islamic accounts, who purportedly lived for over seven hundred years, and was said to have been a non-Arab companion of the Islamic prophet Muhammad from India. No authentic historical reference about Baba Ratan is available; whatever is known about him is based on the medieval accounts and prevalent oral traditions.

== Description ==
According to tradition, Baba Ratan, hailing from Bathinda, Punjab, was a trader who used to take goods from India to Arabia, and was a companion of Muhammad who was blessed to live for over 700 years. As per scholar Manazir Ahsan Gilani, the first reference to Baba Ratan dates back to the 12th century. Around that time, stories started circulating of an Indian sahabi of Muhammad still being alive, and various Muslim scholars and traders from Central Asia and Western Asia, from as far as al-Andalus in the Iberian Peninsula, travelled to Bathinda in order to meet him and hear his accounts on Muhammad and to compile hadith based upon them. The opinions of medieval Muslim scholars regarding him were divided; according to al-Dhahabi (1274–1348), Baba Ratan was an imposter and liar while his contemporary al-Safadi (1296–1363) considered Ratan's claims to be authentic.

The Nath yogis also had several legends surrounding his life, with some describing him as a disciple of Gorakhnath, or even Gorakhnath himself. Others associated him with Muhammad, who foretold his birth at Mecca in Arabia where he travelled during Hajj, before finally settling in Bathinda in Punjab after his conversion to Islam.

In all the various versions of Baba Ratan's life, he is credited with living a long life of 700 years. The name given for Baba Ratan's father varies depending on the tradition, with some variations being Nusr, Sahu, or Janak. Most Muslim accounts of his life claim he travelled to Arabia to become the disciple of Muhammad.

=== Narrative versions ===
==== Hafiz Ibn Hajar ====
According to the 15th century Asab by Hafiz Ibn Hajar, Baba Ratan's grandfather was a Vaishya Hindu from Bathinda named Janak Dev Sarraf. This detail present in the work differs from most Muslim accounts. Some of the accounts of Baba Ratan that Hafiz Ibn Hajar mentions are as follows:

- According to the 12th-century Abu Marwan Andalusi, who learnt about Baba Ratan whilst travelling to Basra in Iraq and supposedly going afterwards to Bathinda to meet Baba Ratan at his monastery, Baba Ratan was an elderly man with white-hair who spoke an unintelligible language. Baba Ratan's words were translated for the traveller, with it consisting of a claim that Baba Ratan had been in Medina during the Battle of the Trench, claiming to be 14-years-old at the time. Baba Ratan claimed that he helped dig the trenches and when Muhammad saw him doing-so, who blessed him to live a long life.
- Sayyed 'Ali bin Muhammad from Khorasan also supposedly visited Baba Ratan and was told that Rattan had played with Muhammad while the prophet was still a child. Baba Ratan claimed to have heard about the arrival of the "seal of the prophets" after the birth of Muhammad, therefore he travelled to Arabia to meet him. When Ratan arrived in Mecca, there was a storm and he saw a child with camels on the outskirts, who ended up being Muhammad. The young Muhammad got into trouble when the boy was separated from one of the camels due to flooding, and Baba Ratan apparently coming to the rescue by grabbing and holding the boy above the water to get to the astray camel. In-response, the boy blessed Ratan with a long-life. Ratan, without knowing that the boy was Muhammad, continued onward to Mecca but when he could not locate the prophet (who was still a young boy), he returned to Bathinda. However, 30 years later Ratan heard about Muhammad's activities in Medina, he went to Arabia again, where Muhammad recognized him as being the man who helped him with his camel years earlier. Then, Ratan converted to Islam and stayed with Muhammad for 12 days before returning to Bathinda.
- Hussain bin Muhammad was another medieval Muslim scholar who apparently visited Baba Ratan. His recorded account is as follows: After arriving in Bathinda in his youth, Hussain noticed a crowd gathered around an old and twisted tree, with a small box in its branches apparently being the home of Baba Ratan. After greeting Ratan, Ratan revealed that as a young boy, he accompanied his father on trading mission to Arabia, and during one of these trips, he helped a boyhood Muhammad with his camels. After returning to India and being some years later, Ratan claimed to have witnessed the moon being split into two and the two halves falling to the east and west respectively, leaving a totally dark sky, but adjoining again some time later, with Ratan interpreting this as a miracle.

==== Nath ====
According to Nath accounts, Baba Ratan spread the Nath tradition in the west. Baba Ratan performed miracles in Kabul which impressed a local ruler, thus he was bestowed with a land-grant to construct a temple and establishing a dhuna (sacred-fire) within it. According to the Nath version, Baba Ratan helped Muhammad of Ghor against Prithviraj Chauhan.

==== Visakha Singh ====
Visakha Singh in Malwa Itihās names Baba Ratan as "Rattan Mal", describing him as a Muslim Siddha and claiming that he betrayed the ruler of Bhatinda, Vena Pal, allowing the Islamic conquest of the settlement and the end of the native dynasty.

== Legacy ==
Reverence of Baba Ratan began in the Mughal-era or perhaps earlier in the period of the Delhi Sultanate. There is a dargah named after him, the Haji Ratan Dargah, in Bathinda, India. People who migrated to Pakistan during the partition of India in 1947 still venerated him. Whilst Muslims, Hindus, and Sikhs all claim Baba Ratan as their own, there is no doubt regarding his connection to Sufism.

== In popular culture ==
A 2012 film by Ajay Bhardwaj titled Milāṅge Bābe Ratan de mele te ("Let’s meet at Baba Ratan’s Fair") references the legendary figure.

== See also ==
- List of non-Arab companions of Muhammad
- Hazrat Baba Haji Sher Dewan
- Malik Dinar
