= Hazrat Baba Haji Sher Dewan =

Shrine in Kothewal, Pakistan

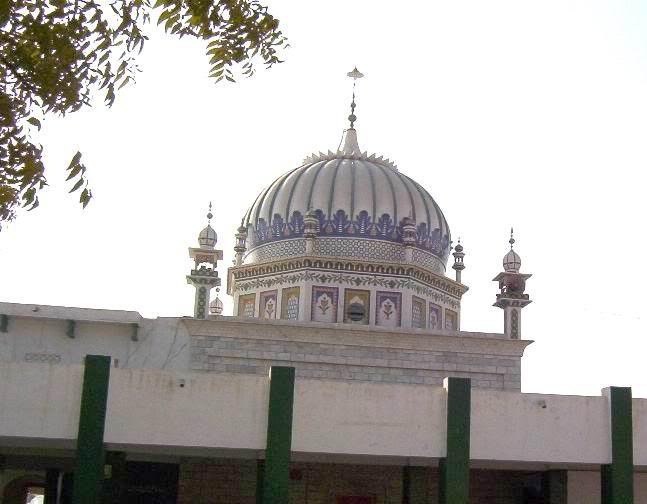
Hazrat Baba Haji Sher Dewan

Hazrat Baba Haji Sher Dewan (Punjabi: حضرت بابا حاجی شیر دیوان) is a shrine to Haji Sher Muhammad Dewan (born 651 AD), a preacher of Islam in the Punjab area. It is located in a village old name Kothewal near Burewala, Pakistan, 125 km from Multan and 73 km from Pakpatan.

== Shrine ==
Hazrat Baba Haji Sher Dewan shrine is the first shrine in South Asia.The shrine is located in the village of Chak Haji Sher Dewan (formerly Kothewal) on the Burewala Sahuka Road. It was constructed by Sultan Mahmood Ghaznavi and renovated by both the Mughal emperor Jahnagir and Dewan Mool Raj. Being chained at the shrine for three consecutive days and nights is believed to cure mental illnesses. Fariduddin Ganjshakar and Alauddin Sabir Kaliyari were born in the area, and Bahauddin Zakariya, Jalaluddin Surkh-Posh Bukhari, Usman Marvandi (aliasLal Shahbaz Qalandar), and Sikhism founder Guru Nanak visited the shrine.

There is a well half a kilometer from the shrine which is called Khoi Baba Farid. It is said that Fariduddin Ganjshakar meditated at the well for twelve years, hanging from a kachi tand (raw-yarn rope), and achieved bhagti. The well is still in use.

== Historical background ==
Baba Haji Sher Muhammad Chawali Masheikh is regarded as one of the earliest Muslim holy saints in Subcontinent Indo-Pak. His birth name was Rai Chawla. Baba Haji Sher played a vital role in the establishment of Islam and the area has great significance in this regard as the first Daragh Shareef of the Subcontinent Indo-Pak. There is no definite history about the birth of Haji Sher Dewan but the inscription of the main door of the grave proved that Haji Sher Dewan was born in 30 Hijri, 650 A.D at Khotwal. Haji Muhammad was great interested in warrior-like activated to his childhood. It is believed that Haji Sher Dewan belonged to a Hindu family. His father Raja Mehipal was a Hindu leader and Chief of Dhudhi Rajputs. Baba Haji Sher Dewan embraced Islam when he was arrested in war. The war is fought between the Wali e Sindh and Islamic forces. Baba Haji Sher also participated in this war and was deprived as a prisoner to Madinah. Baba Haji Sher was much impressed by the religious teachings of Islam and accepted Islam on the hand of Hasan ibn Ali and got religious education from the different Shahab-e-Ikram (companions of Muhammad and also performed Haji. Haji Sher went to karan (Yemen) to spend some days on the Dargah Shareef of Awais Qarni and got religious mysticism from there. After acquiring the stages of mysticism, Haji Sher came back and began preaching Islam. His sister Kanga Barus also helped his mission. The death of Haji Sher was described in 131 Hijri. The mystic saints such as Mir Masood Ghazi deceased late 424 Hijri, Sheikh Ismail Lahori deceased 448 Hijri, Usman Data GhangBakash Lahori Ali Hujwiri 465 Hijri, Syed Ahmad Sakhi Sarwar 577 Hijri, Mu'in al-Din Chishti Ajmeri 633 Hijri, Khawajah Bakhtiar Kaki 635 Hijri and included Baba Fariduddin Ganjshakar was deceased late. Therefore it will have to confess that the shrine of Haji Sher Dewan is the earliest shrine which is located at 317/E.B Tehsil Burewala District Vehari. 69

== Sufi Rituals ==
Almost all of the followers reported that they visit the Sufi saint‟s shrines to get mental satisfaction and tranquility. In case of tension or disturbance in their lives, they visited the Sufi shrine and get peace of mind which serves as meditation, they get hope for success and get confidence about their wishes to be fulfilled. They come here and talk to Allah. They said that they bow to Allah, beg pardon from Allah to forgive their Gunah (sins), and show them the right path. When they leave the shrine they feel very relaxed and enlightened. A majority of the believers had strong and firm beliefs about the blessing of Sufi and considered them alive. In their views, he could listen to followers and work as a mediator between them and Allah, by and large, they believed that the Sufi of the shrine knows their problems. On further probe, they highlighted that they come on Darbar and pray to get rid of their worries. Sufi knows their worries, convey them to Allah and ask for a blessing. The belief if they directly pray/wish to Allah, there are few chances of acceptance or fulfillment of that pray/wish. Shrines are big sources of creating mutual relationships between the people of different areas. The people from far areas free from generational prejudice get together here and create brotherhood, peace, and cultural harmony. "Chadar charhana" and "Daig charhana" are such rituals that cannot be performed by a single person so friends, relatives are invited for this purpose. These rituals play a pivotal role to forget mutual disputes between the people and family.

== See also ==
- Baba Ratan Hindi
- Cheraman Juma Mosque
