= Tufail Mohammad =

Military officer in Pakistan army

Major Tufail Mohammad NH
- The portrait of Maj. Tufail Mohammad (1914–1958)
- Born: Tufail Mohammad; 22 July 1914; Hoshiarpur, Punjab Province, British India
- Died: 7 August 1958 (aged 44); Dowarabazar, East Pakistan, Pakistan
- Burial place: Burewala, Punjab, Pakistan
- Spouse: Niaz Bibi
- Children: Naseem Akhtar (Daughter); Azmat Akhtar (grandson)
- Military career
- Allegiance: (British Raj) British India (1932–1947); Pakistan (1947–1958)
- Branch/service: British Indian Army; Pakistan Army; East Pakistan Rifles
- Service years: 1932–1958
- Rank: Major
- Nicknames: Fateh-i-Lakshmipur; Eng. Lit.: (Victor of Lakshmipur)
- Service number: PA-1224
- Units: 16th Punjab Regiment; Punjab Regiment
- Conflicts: World War II; First Kashmir War; 1958 East Pakistan-India border clashes †
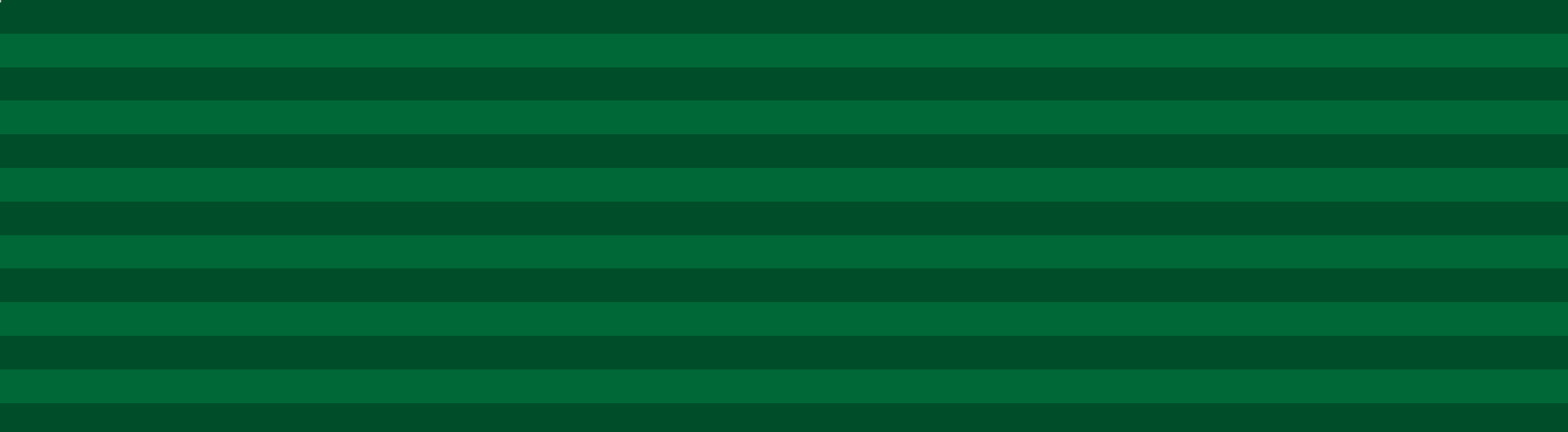
- Awards: Nishan-e-Haider

Major Tufail Mohammad (Urdu: طفیل محمد; b. 22 June 1914 – 7 August 1958), NH, was a Pakistani military officer and the third recipient of Pakistan's highest military award, the Nishan-e-Haider (Eng. Trans.: Emblem of the Lion) for his actions of valor during the 1958 East Pakistan-India border clashes.

== Biography ==
=== Early life ===
Tufail Mohammad was born in Hoshiarpur, Punjab, during the British Raj, into a Gurjar Punjabi family on 22 June 1914 according to his gravestone markings. He was educated at the D.A.V. College in Jalandhar.

=== Military career ===
In 1932, he enlisted in the Indian Army and was trained at the Indian Military Academy in Dehradun in 1941. He was commissioned into the 1st Battalion of the 16th Punjab Regiment (1/16th) in 1943. Attached to the Punjab Regiment, he served on the training assignments to the Punjab Regiment. After the Partition of India, his regiment was transferred to the Pakistan Army and he served in administrative positions in the Punjab Regiment between 1947 and 1958. From 1947 to 1954, he was later deputed by the federal government to the provincial governments to serve as an advisor and trainer to the law enforcement agencies before permanently dispatched to the East Pakistan Rifles in 1954.

His career in the military mostly served with the East Pakistan Rifles where he served as the commanding officer of the military company near the Indo-East Pakistani border. In 1957, Indian army troops crossed the Border, and occupied the village of Lakshmipur located at Dowarabazar of Sylhet District in then East Pakistan. Responding to the infiltration, Major Tufail was ordered to form three quick response teams to launch an attack on three sides on the resting Indian Army battalion.

==== 1958 border clashes ====
On 7 August 1958, Major Tufail made a slow quadrupedal movement towards the Indian Army posts and engaged in a firefight with the enemy forces as close as 15 yards in an attempt to make them withdraw from their positions. Leading attack team from the back side of the post while other two teams engaged the enemy from front and right sides, Major Tufail was the first casualty who sustained the injury from the upcoming fire inside the bunker, and threw a grenade at the near post, that killed the enemy machine gunners. Inside the bunker, the mortally wounded Major Tufail had to engage in a close quarters battle with the Indian Army soldiers, eventually taking out the machine gunners that were targeting the Pakistan Army soldiers on the front side by throwing grenades and engaging with machine guns.

His actions of valor reportedly saved many Pakistan Army soldiers when he led the attacking team from the back side of the battalion bunker as the Indian Army soldiers were driven out retreated to their original positions, leaving four dead and three of their personnel behind, who were taken as the war prisoners. Despite receiving immediate medical attention, Major Tufail himself succumbed to his wounds and quoted his last word to his junior officer: "I have completed my duty; the enemy is on the run." On 7 August 1958, Major Tufail succumbed to his wounds– he was 43–44 years old at the time of his death.

Major Tufail was buried in Burewala, Punjab in Pakistan, and the federal government later built a marble tomb in 1967. In 1993, he was subjected to a biographical war telefilm, "Major Tufail Mohammad Shaheed" produced and directed by the Qasim Jilali of the PTV.

In 1967, he was posthumously awarded the Nishan-e-Haider by President Ayub Khan, becoming the third officer to receive the award.

The Presidential Nishan-e-Haider citation on his grave is written in Urdu, and it reads, with translation, as:

Citation:

After the establishment of Pakistan, Tufail Muhammad served with distinction in the 13th Punjab, leading to promotion to Major. In 1958, the Maj. Tufail was affiliated with the East Pakistan Rifles and was trusted as the commanding officer of the quick response teams of the close quarters combat to liberate Lakshmipur by undertaking the mission. Success of these efforts came with the display of the tremendous courage despite being mortally wounded while being under fire.

The "Green and White Flag with the Star and Crescent" was hoisted by the troops in Lakshmipur in East-Pakistan. On 7 August 1958, Maj. Tufail sacrificed his life to save his subordinate troops and was posthumously presented with the Nishan-e-Haider.

=== Galleries ===
Tomb and gravestone of Maj. Tufail Mohammad
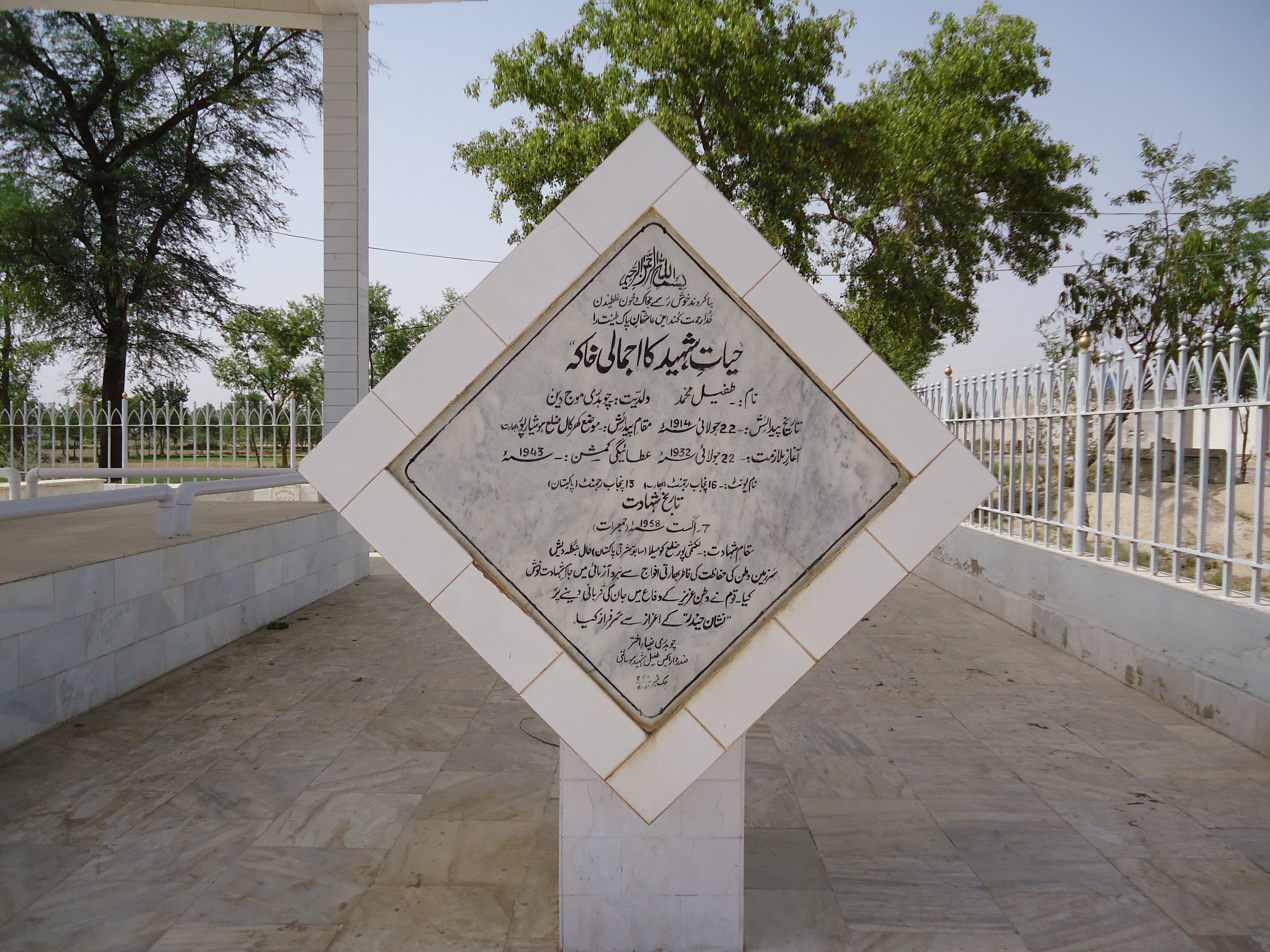
The inscription on the life of Major Tufail Muhammad Shaheed at his tomb in Tufailabad (Tufail Town) Graveyard

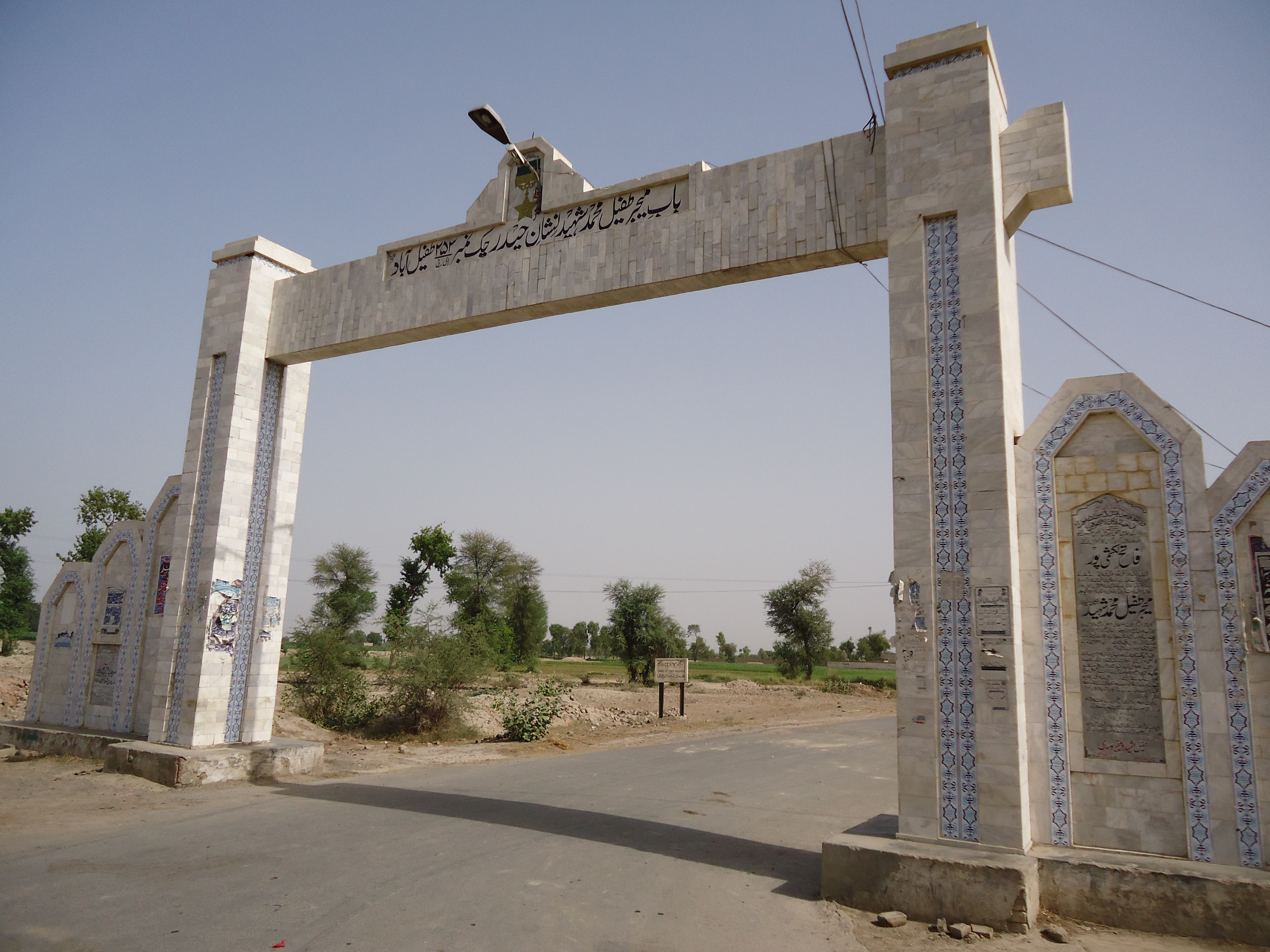
The Tufail Gate, entrance to Tufailabad, the village of Major Tufail Muhammad Shaheed (Nishan e Haider)

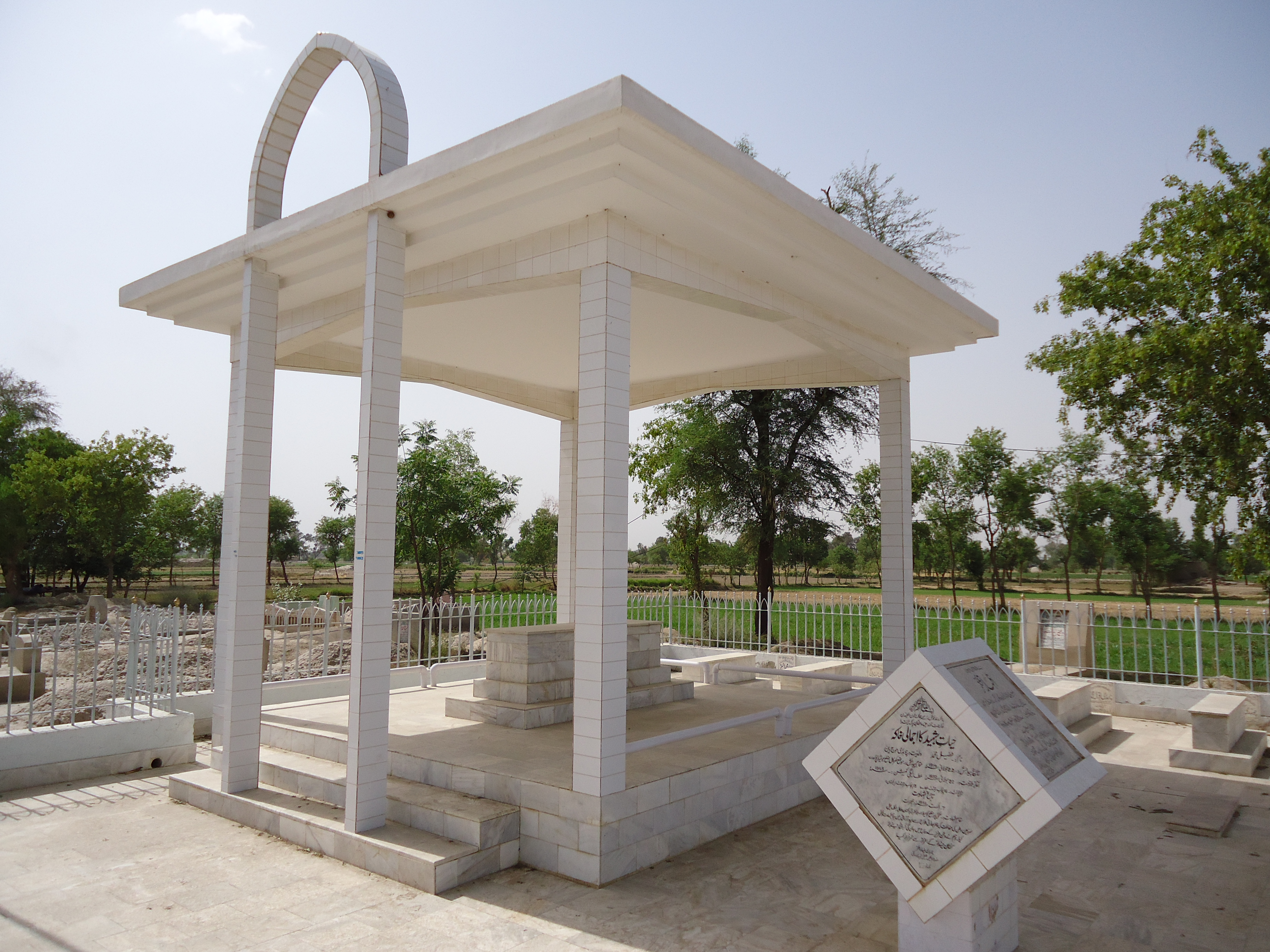
The tomb of Maj. Tufail Muhammad

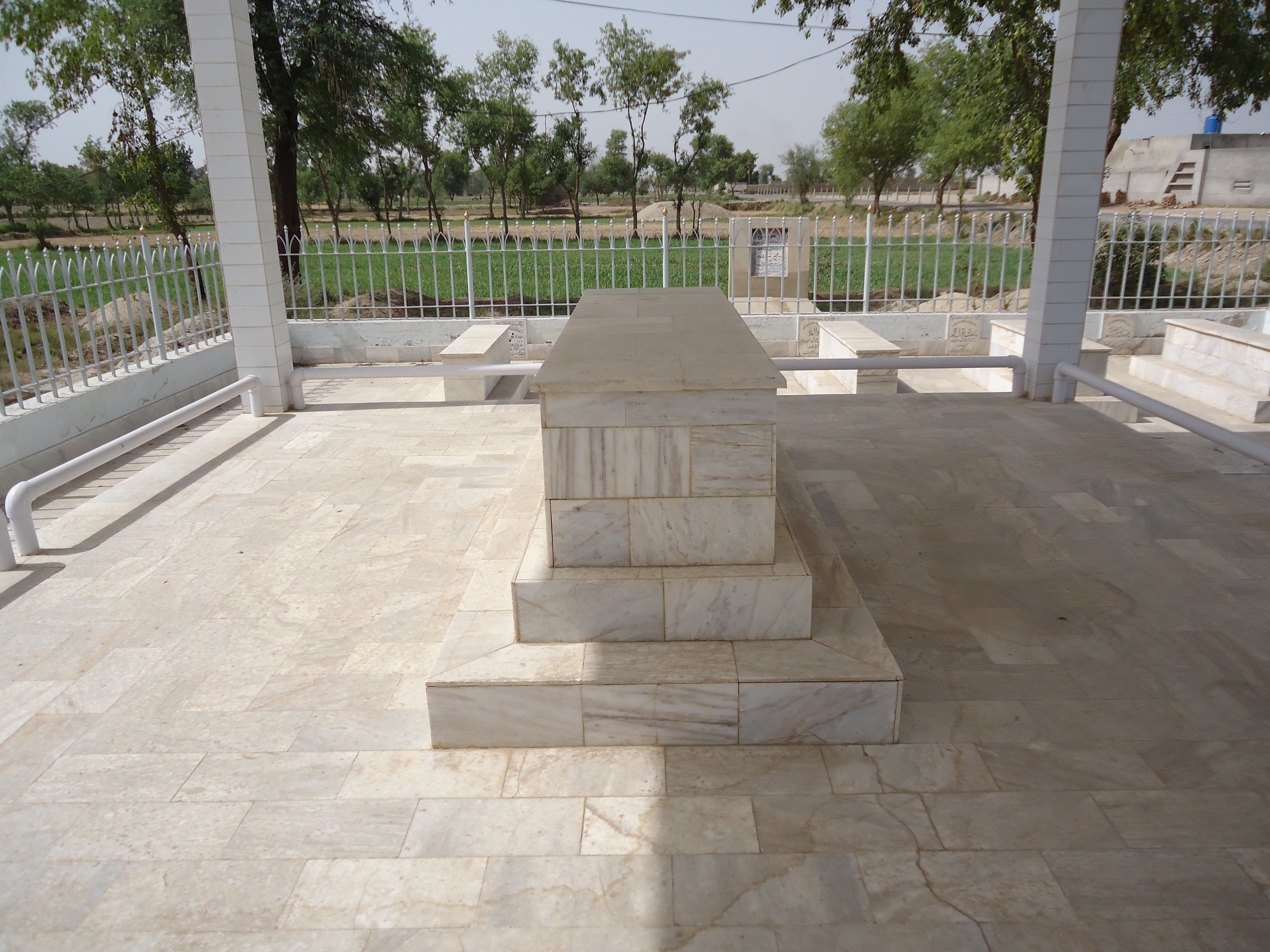
The grave of Major Tufail Muhammad Shaheed (Nishah e Haider) at his tomb in Tufailabad Graveyard

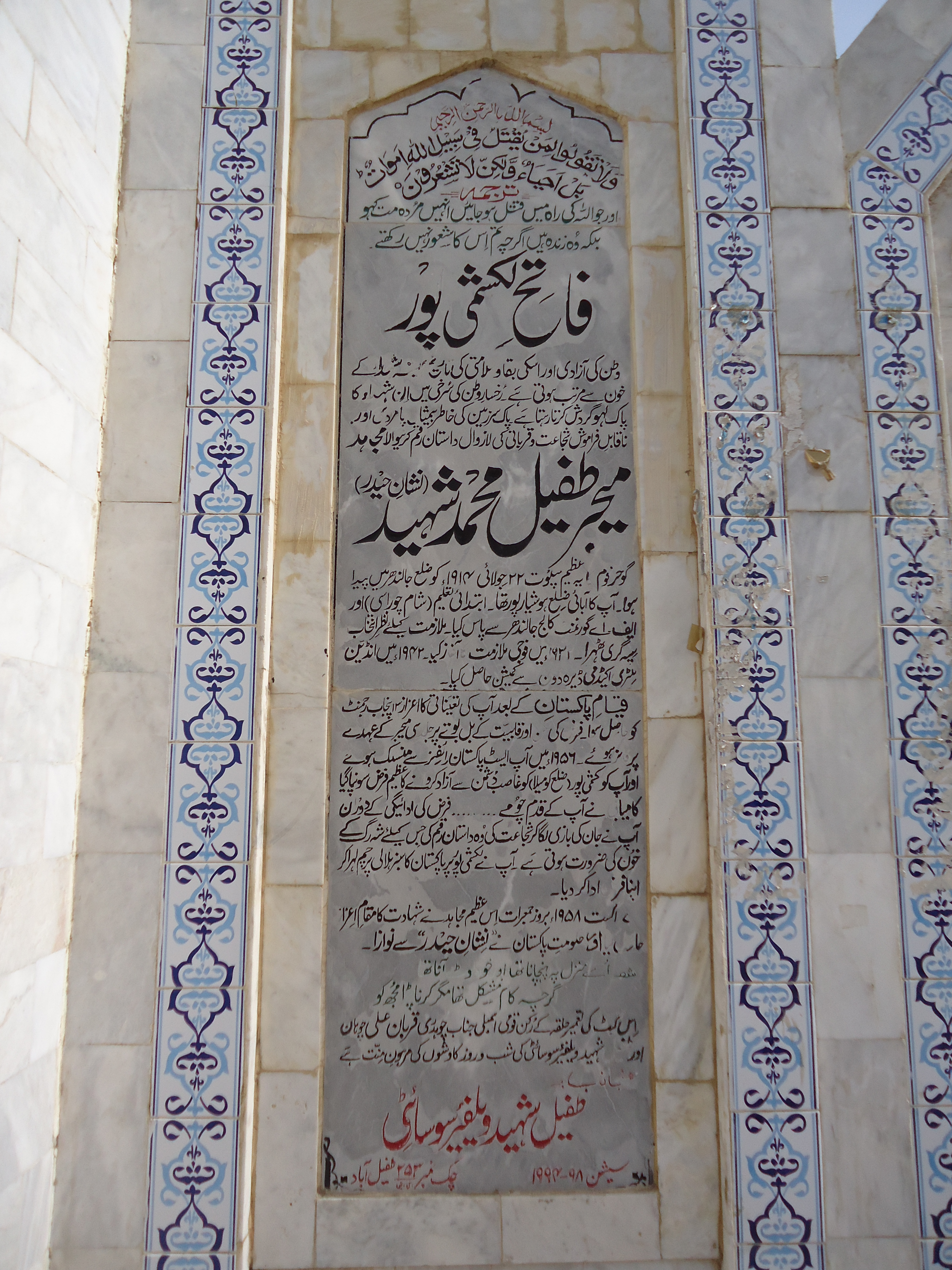
The citation and grave of Major Tufail

== Awards and decorations ==
Nishan-e-Haider Recipient
- Date: 1958
- Country: Islamic Republic of Pakistan
- Presented by: President Iskandar Mirza

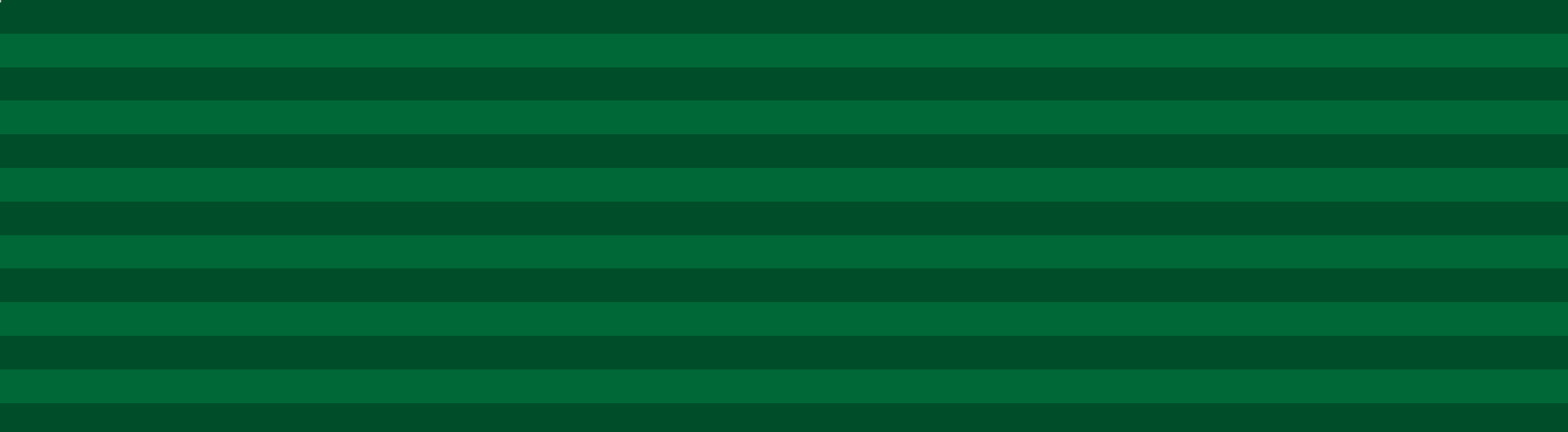

| | Nishan-e-Haider (Emblem of the Lion) 1958 Border Skirmish Posthumously | | |
| Pakistan Tamgha (Pakistan Medal) 1947 | Tamgha-e-Jamhuria (Republic Commemoration Medal) 1956 | War Medal 1939-1945 | India Service Medal 1939–1945 |

=== Foreign decorations ===
Foreign awards
| UK | War Medal 1939-1945 |
| UK | India Service Medal 1939–1945 |

== See also ==
- List of the Recipients of Nishan-e-Haider
