= Barani Institute of Sciences =

Private institute in Punjab, Pakistan

- بارانی انسٹیٹیوٹ آف سائنسز
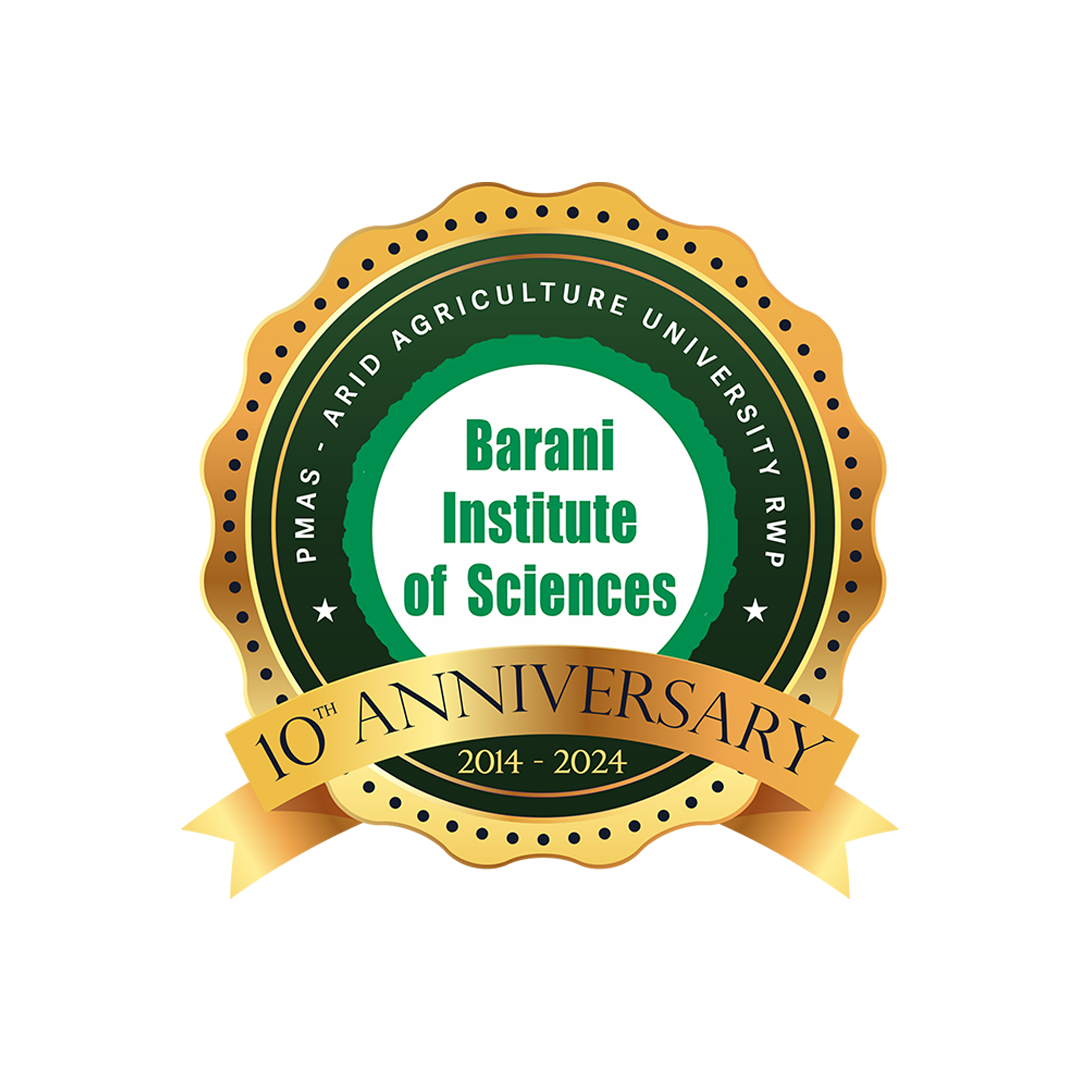
- Type: Private
- Established: 2014; 12 years ago
- Affiliations: Pir Mehr Ali Shah Arid Agriculture University
- Location: Sahiwal and Burewala, Punjab, Pakistan
- Campus: Urban
- Colours: Green and white
- Website: baraniinstitute.edu.pk

The Barani Institute of Sciences (BIS; Urdu: بارانی انسٹیٹیوٹ آف سائنسز) is a private degree-awarding institute in Punjab, Pakistan. Established in 2014 as a joint-venture institution of the Pir Mehr Ali Shah Arid Agriculture University, Rawalpindi (PMAS-AAUR), the institute operates two campuses, at Sahiwal and Burewala, and offers undergraduate and postgraduate programmes across the management, life and computer sciences. Degrees are awarded by PMAS-AAUR.

== Campuses ==
The institute's Sahiwal campus is located at 520 B/VII, Jail Road, Sahiwal, and its Burewala campus on Chichawatni Road, Burewala.

== Academic programmes ==
BIS offers undergraduate and postgraduate programmes through three principal academic groupings: management sciences, life sciences and computer sciences. Programmes offered include:

- Management sciences: Bachelor of Business Administration (BBA Hons; BBA two-year)
- Life sciences: BS in Human Nutrition and Dietetics; BS in Medical Laboratory Technology; BS in Biochemistry
- Computer sciences: BS in Computer Science; BS in Software Engineering; BS in Computer Science (Artificial Intelligence)
- Other: MSc in Statistics; MSc in Mathematics

== Governance ==
The institute is operated by the Barani Foundation, whose Board of Governors constitutes an executive committee responsible for academic, financial and operational policy. Degrees awarded to BIS students are conferred by PMAS-Arid Agriculture University, Rawalpindi.
