= Pir Mehr Ali Shah Arid Agriculture University =

Agricultural university in Rawalpindi, Pakistan

Coordinates: 33.647°N 73.083°E

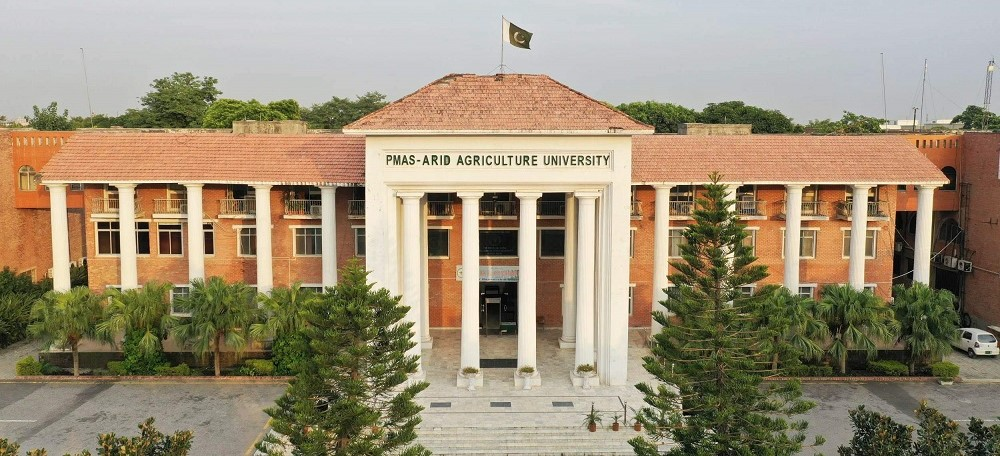
- Other name: UAAR
- Former names: University Arid Agriculture, Rawalpindi (UAAR)
- Type: Public Sector University (Research and Teaching)
- Established: 1994
- Affiliations: Higher Education Commission of Pakistan
- Chancellor: Sardar Saleem Haider Khan
- Vice-Chancellor: Prof. Dr. Qamar-uz-Zaman
- Students: c. 13000
- Location: Shamsabad, Rawalpindi, Punjab, Pakistan
- Website: uaar.edu.pk

Pir Mehr Ali Shah Arid Agriculture University (abbreviated as PMAS-Arid University) is a public research university in Rawalpindi, Punjab, Pakistan. It is named after Pir Meher Ali Shah, a Punjabi Hanafi scholar.

The university is ranked at No. 2 in the agriculture/veterinary category as per the Higher Education Commission of Pakistan and 7th overall in the ranking of universities in Pakistan.

Arid Agriculture University offers degree programmes leading to Bachelor, Master and Ph.D. in disciplines including Food Science & Technology, Computer Sciences, Management Sciences, Pure Sciences, Agriculture, Agricultural Engineering, Veterinary & Animal Sciences, Social Sciences and other Arts and Fine Arts programs.

== History ==
In the 1970s, the government of Punjab established an agricultural college in Rawalpindi for the development of rain-fed agriculture. The college was upgraded to the level of university in 1994.

The Pir Mehr Ali Shah Arid Agriculture University is named after Chishti Sufi saint Pir Mehr Ali Shah. The University is now working on two mega projects titled DDSDP and ENCIB. There is a centre for precision agriculture and national centre for industrial biotechnology.

== Academics ==
AAUR teaches courses in five faculties, six institutes and one National center (as well as joint programs with other institutions):

- Faculty of Crop and Food Sciences
- Institute of Food and Nutritional Sciences
- Faculty of Sciences
- Faculty of Agricultural Engineering and Technology
- Faculty of Social Sciences
- Faculty of Veterinary & Animal Sciences (with departments in Animal Sciences, Veterinary Basic Science, Patho-Biology, Clinical Studies and Poultry Science) 85 students
- Institute of Education and Research
- University Institute of Management Sciences
- University Institute of Information Technology
- University Institute of Biochemistry & Biotechnology (UIBB)
- Faculty of Agriculture Engineering
- Institute of Geo-informatics and Earth Observation (IGEO)
- Institute of Soil and Environmental Sciences (ISES)

== See also ==
- Arid-zone agriculture
- International Center for Agricultural Research in the Dry Areas
- Xeriscaping
- Xerophyte
- Barani Institute of Information Technology
- Barani Institute of Sciences
