= Barani Institute of Information Technology =

- Type: Private
- Established: 1998
- Director: Muhammad Jamil Sawar
- Students: 2000+
- Location: Rawalpindi, Punjab, Pakistan
- Affiliations: PMAS Arid Agriculture University, Rawalpindi
- Website: www.biit.edu.pk

Barani Institute of Information Technology (BIIT) was established at the Pir Mehr Ali Shah Arid Agriculture University and is located in Rawalpindi, Punjab, Pakistan. The institute is a self-financed/ self-funded project and was established as a partnership venture between the Pir Mehr Ali Shah Arid Agriculture University and Resource Organizers and Software Engineers (ROSE) International.

== Academic programs ==
- Bachelor of Science in Computer Science (General Computing) BSCS (GC)
- Bachelor of Science in Computer Science (Artificial Intelligence) BSCS (AI)
- Bachelor of Science in Software Engineering BS (SE)
