= Gaggo =

Town in Punjab, Pakistan

Coordinates: 30°13′N 72°50′E

گگو Gaggoo Gaggoo Mandi
- City
- Gaggo
- Interactive map of گگو
- Country: Pakistan
- Region: Punjab
- District: Vehari District
- Time zone: PST
- Website: www.vehari.com.pk

Gaggo (Punjabi: گگو), also called Gaggo Mandi, is a city situated on the Multan road between Burewala and Arifwala, in Vehari District, Punjab, Pakistan. It is the subdivision of Burewala city. According to the census of 2019, its population is 156,468. It is located at a distance of 16 km while its distance from Arifwala is 25 km.It is said that her ancient name was Gangu, a Hindu woman, gradually changing from Gangu to Gago.
