= Burewala =

City in Punjab, Pakistan

Burewala بُورےوالا (Punjabi)
- City
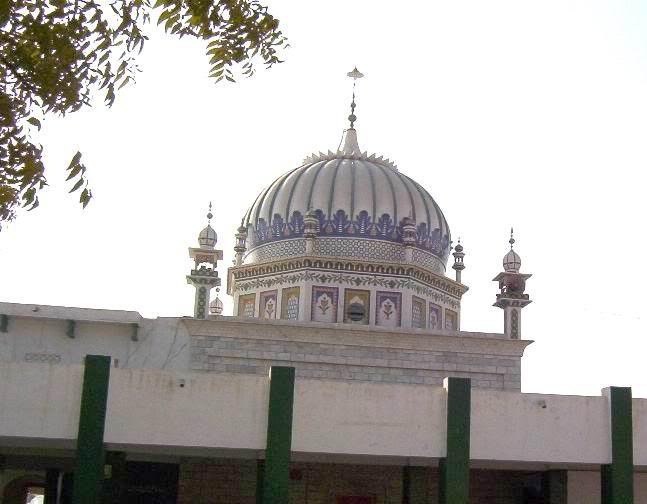
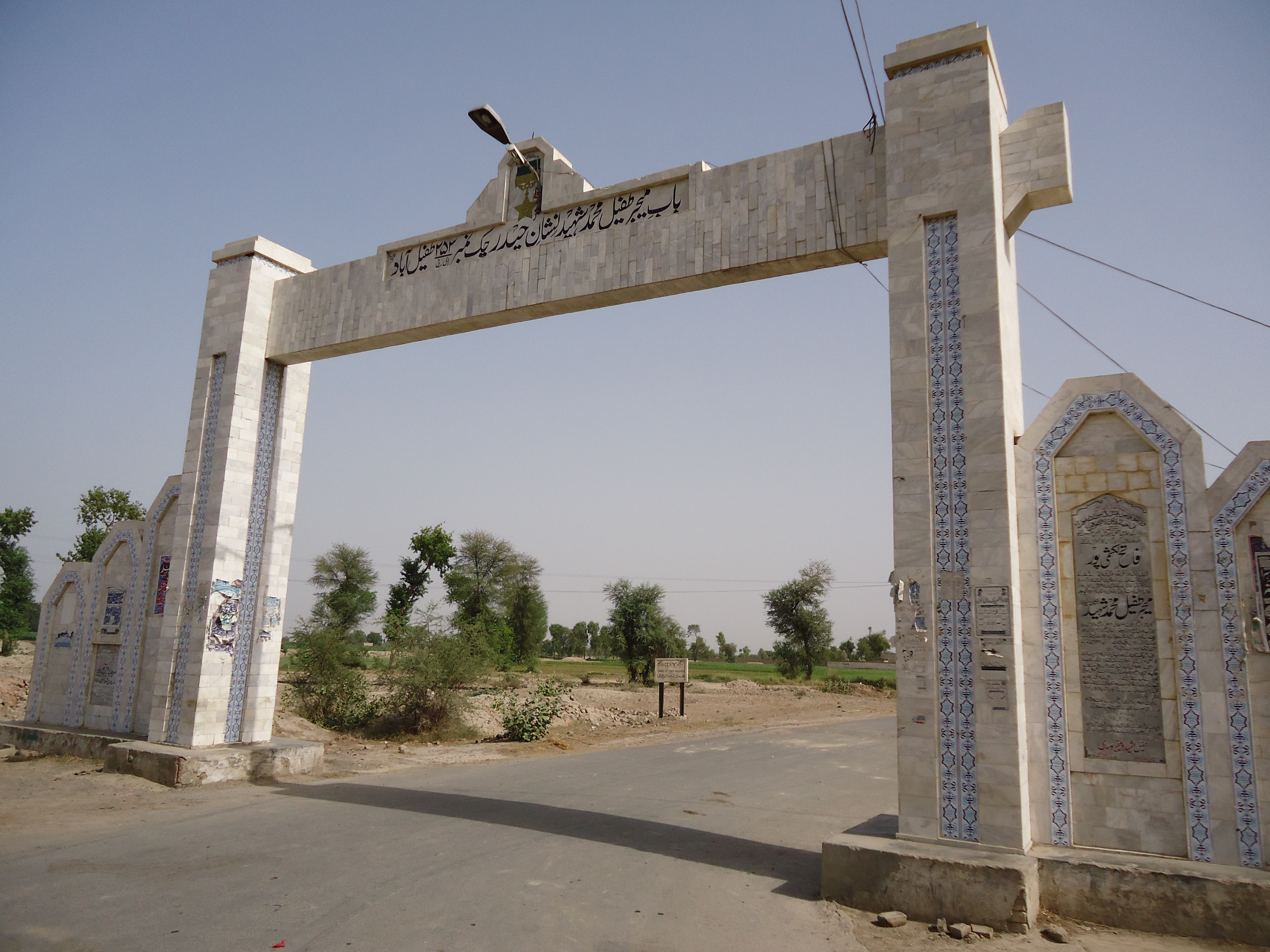
- From top to bottom: Hazrat Baba Haji Sher Dewan's shrine & Major Tufail Mohammad (Nishan-e-Haider) Gate

- Location within Punjab, Pakistan Location within Pakistan
- Coordinates: 30°9′33″N 72°40′54″E
- Country: Pakistan
- Province: Punjab

Area
  - Total: 1,313 km^{2} (507 sq mi)
- Elevation: 133 m (436 ft)

Population (2023 Census of Pakistan)
  - Total: 361,664
  - Rank: 27th, Pakistan
  - Density: 275.4/km^{2} (713.4/sq mi)
- Time zone: UTC+5 (PST)
- Calling code: 067
- Website: www.vehari.com.pk mcburewala.lgpunjab.org.pk

Burewala (Punjabi: بورے والہ), is a city of Vehari District in Punjab, Pakistan. The city of Burewala is the headquarters of Burewala Tehsil, an administrative subdivision of the district. It is the 27th largest city of Pakistan by population.

== History ==
Burewala is situated on the Delhi–Multan Road. The Sutlej River crosses Burewala near the towns of Kachi Pakki, Jamlera, and Sahuka. The Shrine of Haji Sher Dewan Chawli Mashaikh is located in Dewan Sahib, approximately 18 km from Burewala. Before its settlement, the area was covered with jungle and was later inhabited by the Dhuddi tribe of Rajputs. With the operation of the Pakpattan Canal, agriculture began to flourish, leading to the establishment of villages and the clearing of jungles for cultivation. As this area was part of the 'Eastern Canal Division', it was designated as village no. 118/EB (EB = Eastern Barr). In the northern part of Burewala Tehsil, remnants of an old water canal still exist, now known as Sukh Bias.

== Demographics ==
Population

Population of Burewala city.

Historical population

Year	Pop.	±% p.a.
1951	15,372	—
1961	34,237	+8.34%
1972	57,741	+4.87%
1981	86,311	+4.57%

Year	Pop.	±% p.a.
1998	152,097	+3.39%
2017	232,030	+2.25%
2023	361,664	+7.68%

=== Languages ===
According to the 2023 census of Pakistan, Burewala City has an overwhelmingly Punjabi-speaking population, with Punjabi spoken by 94.03% of residents. Urdu is the second most common first language at 5.30%. While an additional 0.66% of the population spoke other languages of Pakistan (mostly Sindhi and Pashto).

Languages of Burewala City (2023)
1. Punjabi (94.0%)
2. Urdu (5.30%)
3. Others (0.66%)

== Etymology ==
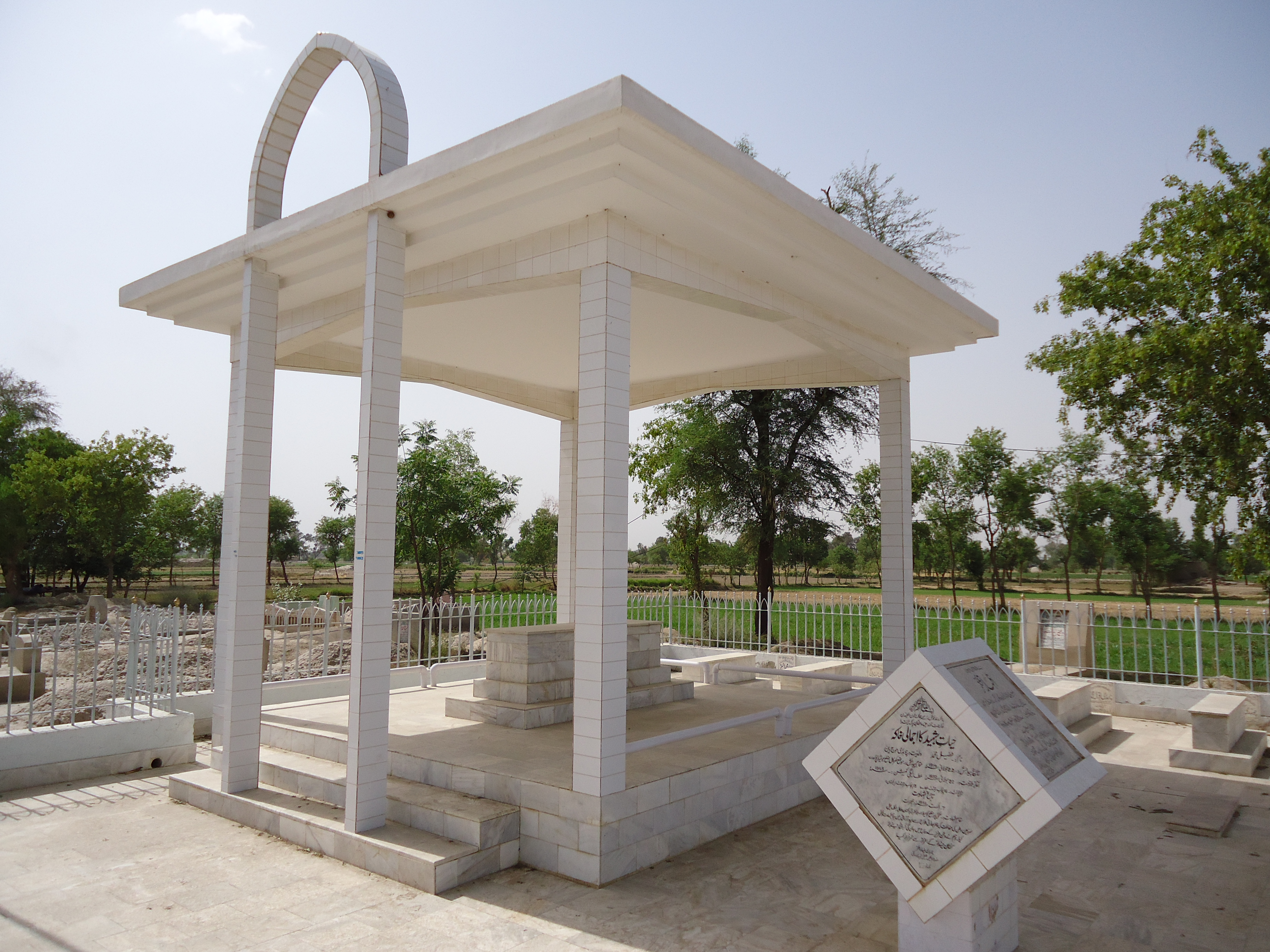
The tomb of Major Tufail Muhammad Shaheed (Nishan e Haider)

The exact origin of Burewala's name is unknown; however, there are different theories. One theory is that the city is named after a person named "Burha." He was, according to some people, 'Sikh'. The village is also called "Old Bura" or "Purana Boora." The people of this village constructed a well with a diameter of 8 feet and named it after their ancestor so it was called "Chah Boorhay wala" (Well of Burha). This well is now included in the P.I. Link canal. Due to this well the new city was named Burewala. In July 1976, Burewala was upgraded as a subdivision. The areas of Gaggo Mandi, Shaikh Fazal, Sahuka and Jamlera, Chak No.327/E.B were included in the subdivision.

== Education ==
Notable educational institutes in the city include:

- Government Degree College Burewala
- University of Agriculture, Faisalabad, Burewala Campus
- Barani Institute of Sciences, Burewala Campus
- Punjab College of Science, Burewala Campus
- Superior University Lahore, Burewala Campus
- Government M.C Model High School, Burewala
- Government B.T.M High School Burewala
- Tehzeeb-Ul-Itfal Model School Burewala

== Notable personalities ==
- Hazrat Baba Haji Sher Dewan (7th century Sufi saint), shrine located in Burewala
- Major Tufail Mohammad (Nishan-e-Haider award winner, Pakistan's highest military award)
- International cricketer Waqar Younis, known as the Burewala express in cricket
- World's Tallest Cricketer Muhammad Irfan
- Ancestral village of Rajesh Khanna, notable Indian film actor
- Gulraiz Sadaf, another cricketer who was born in Burewala and plays for the team of Multan.
