= History of Azad Kashmir =

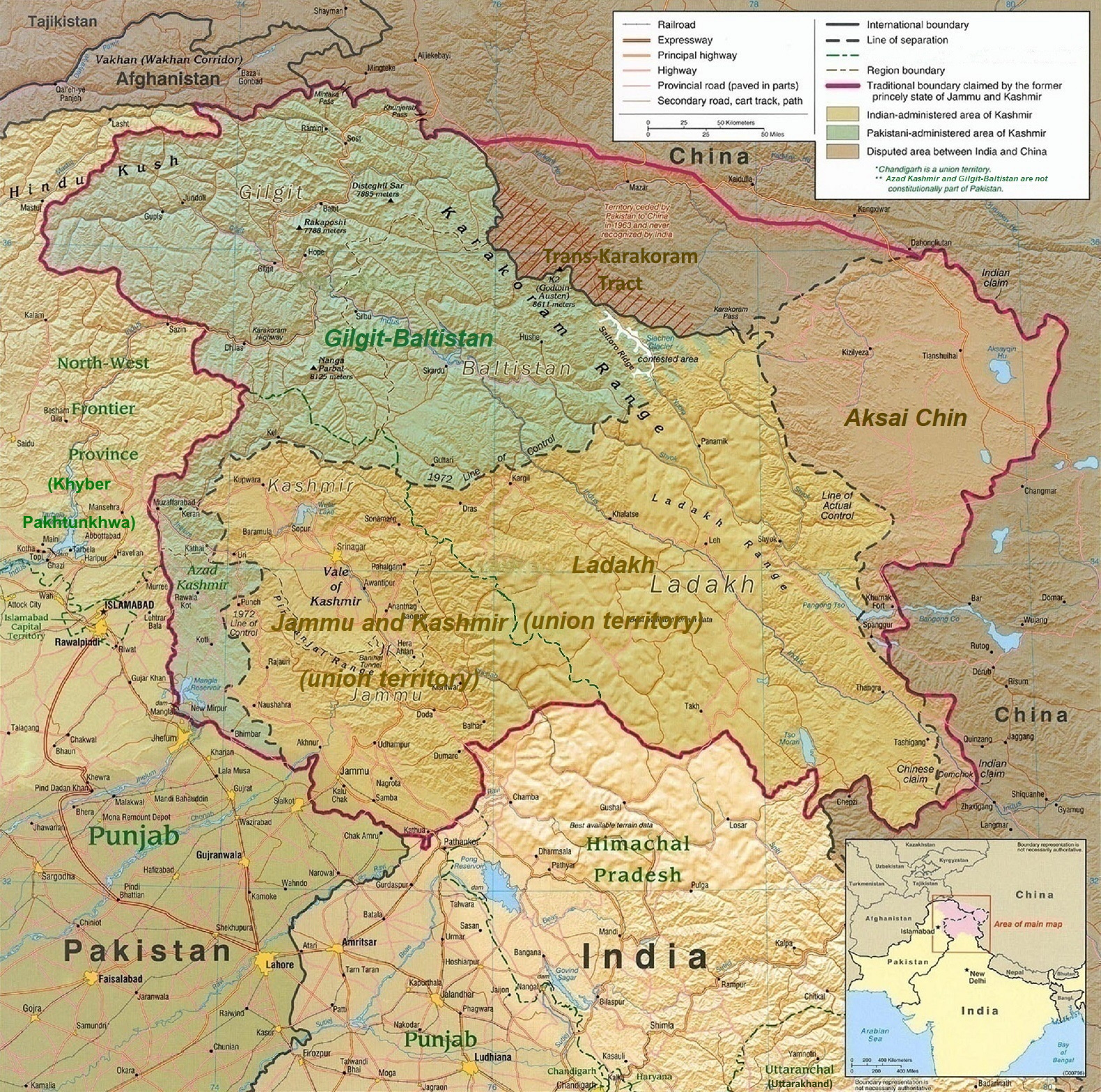
A map of the disputed Kashmir region with the two Pakistani-administered territories shown in green

Civil flag of Azad Kashmir.

The history of Azad Kashmir, a Pakistan-administered portion of the disputed Kashmir region, is intertwined with the history of the Kashmir princely state during the Dogra rule. The Kashmir region has been the subject of a dispute between Pakistan and India since 1947. Azad Kashmir borders the Pakistani provinces of Punjab and Khyber Pakhtunkhwa to the south and west respectively, Gilgit-Baltistan to the north, and the Indian-administered union territory of Jammu and Kashmir to the east.

== Modern history ==
The princely state of Jammu and Kashmir came into being in 1846 after the First Anglo-Sikh War. Prior to that, Jammu was a tributary of the Sikh Empire based in Lahore. Gulab Singh, formerly a footman in the army of Maharaja Ranjit Singh who distinguished himself in various campaigns, was appointed as the Raja of Jammu in 1822. The Kashmir Valley was also a part of the Sikh Empire, ruled through a separate governor. Raja Gulab Singh successively invaded and captured Rajouri (1821), Kishtwar (1821), and through his general Zorawar Singh, Suru Valley and Kargil (1835), Ladakh (1834–1840), and Baltistan (1840). He became a wealthy and influential noble in the Sikh court.

During the First Anglo-Sikh war in 1845–1846, Gulab Singh sided with the British, leading to a Sikh defeat. In the ensuing Treaty of Lahore, the Sikhs were made to cede Kashmir and Hazara to the British, in lieu of their indemnity, and to recognize Gulab Singh as an independent Maharaja. A week later, in the Treaty of Amritsar, Gulab Singh paid the British the indemnity that was due from the Sikhs, and acquired Kashmir in return. Thus Gulab Singh became the Maharaja of the state of Jammu and Kashmir, founding the Dogra dynasty. The Treaty of Amritsar continues to be widely regarded by the Kashmiris as a "sale deed".

In 1856, Gulab Singh abdicated in favour of his son Ranbir Singh, who became the Maharaja. During the Indian Mutiny of 1857, Ranbir Singh again came to the aid of the British and was duly rewarded. During Ranbir Singh's rule, Kashmir faced oppressive despotism, as recognized by British observers. In 1860, Ranbir Singh annexed Gilgit. Hunza and Nagar became tributaries after the Anglo-Indian campaign of Hunza-Nagar in 1891, not only to maharaja but British as well. Ranbir Singh was succeeded by Pratap Singh (1885–1925) and Hari Singh (1925–1952), the latter being the ruler at the time of Indian independence.

The state of Jammu and Kashmir in 1947 was extremely diverse. The Valley of Kashmir, the most populous region, was a historically powerful kingdom, having stood up to the foreign invaders, and remaining independent until the time of Akbar. It was 97% Muslim, with 3% religious minorities, mostly the Hindu community of Kashmiri Pandits. The Jammu division's eastern districts had a Hindu majority population culturally aligned to the Hill states of Himachal Pradesh. Its western districts like Poonch, Kotli and Mirpur had a Muslim majority culturally aligned to the West Punjab plains. Ladakh, a large mountainous region, had a mostly Buddhist population culturally aligned to Tibet. The northern areas of Gilgit and Baltistan were almost entirely Muslim, with Buddhist minorities, culturally aligned to Pakhtun and Central Asian regions.

Poonch was a jagir bestowed by the Maharaja Ranjit Singh to Gulab Singh's brother Raja Dhian Singh. Upon the latter's death, the jagir was reclaimed by Lahore and it was passed to Gulab Singh in the treaties of Lahore and Amritsar. However, Dhian Singh's son Jawahar Singh put forward a claim to Poonch, and it was granted to him subject to the condition that he was to consult Gulab Singh on `all matters of importance'. He was also expected to present Gulab Singh one horse decked in gold trappings every year. After the death of Raja Jawahar Singh, Hari Singh dispossessed his young son of control over Poonch and set out to integrate it into his State. The move was unpopular in Poonch. The Mahajara's reign imposed a variety of new taxes and the Dogra troops were sent over to enforce collection.

The Sudhan tribe concentrated in Poonch with a smaller population in the northern areas of Kotli (part of the Mirpur Division) were warlike. They comprised the only Muslim troops in the Maharaja Hari Singh's army. During the Second World War, over 60,000 of them fought in the British Army. After demobilization, they were forced to go back to farming because the Maharaja refused to accept them into his own army, and they faced the new taxation system of the Maharaja. In the Spring of 1947, they mounted a `no-tax' campaign, inviting severe reprisals from the Maharaja's government. In July, the Maharaja ordered that all Muslims must surrender their arms to the authorities. However, as the Partition violence spread, the same arms were reportedly distributed to the non-Muslims. These tensions led to an uprising in Poonch.

== Formation of Azad Kashmir ==
At the time of the Partition of India in 1947, the British abandoned their suzerainty over the princely states, which were left with the options of joining India or Pakistan or remaining independent. Hari Singh, the Maharaja of Jammu and Kashmir, chose to remain independent, offering to sign standstill agreements with both the dominions.

In the spring of 1947, an uprising against the Maharaja had broken out in Poonch, an area bordering the Rawalpindi division of the West Punjab. This came after the growth of socio-political tensions between the Dogra Maharaja of Kashmir, Hari Singh and the Muslim (mainly Poonchi) population and the spillover from neighboring Punjab. Maharaja's troops, aided and abetted by Hindu and Sikh mobs, committed massacre of Muslims in Jammu, which saw over one hundred thousand Muslims killed by Hindus and many more forced to seek refuge in Pakistan. Hari Singh is said to have started levying punitive taxes on the peasantry which provoked a local revolt and the administration resorted to brutal suppression. The area's population, full of recently demobilized soldiers from the Second World War, rebelled against the Maharaja's forces and gained control of almost the entire district. Retaliatory killings and expulsion of Hindus and Sikhs occurred in Mirpur, Bhimber, Muzaffarabad, Kotil, Poonch etc. The Provisional State of Azad (Free) Jammu and Kashmir was created on 24 October 1947 when a group of rebels (the 'Azad Army') announced its formation in the southwestern areas of J&K. The Azad Army numbered some 50,000 men, which included many ex-servicemen of the Second World War, while the locally popular All J&K Muslim Conference allied with the Muslim League and organized a "war council." Attempts by the Maharaja to repress the uprising failed as more began to take up arms, as Poonch and parts of neighboring Mirpur and Muzaffarabad districts were lost.

On 21 October, several thousand Pashtun tribesmen from the North-West Frontier Province poured into Jammu and Kashmir in order to liberate it from the Maharaja's rule. They were led by experienced military leaders and were equipped with modern arms. The Maharaja's crumbling forces were unable to withstand the onslaught. The raiders captured the towns of Muzaffarabad and Baramulla, the latter just twenty miles northwest of the State's capital Srinagar. On 24 October, the Maharaja requested the military assistance of India, which responded that it was unable to help him unless he acceded to India. Accordingly, on 26 October 1947, Maharaja Hari Singh signed an Instrument of Accession, handing over control of defense, external affairs and communications to the Government of India. Indian troops were immediately airlifted into Srinagar. Sardar Ibrahim Khan and Azad Army forces supported the invasion and compelled Muslim forces of the J&K army in Domel to mutiny. Two days later Sardar Ibrahim Khan declared the formation of Azad Kashmir. After this the Indian Army arrived in J&K, opposing the Azad Army, Pukhtoon forces, and Gilgitis, then later Baltis and from May 1948 the Pakistan Army. Pakistan intervened subsequently. Fighting ensued between the Indian and Pakistani armies, with the two areas of control stabilized, more or less, around what is now known as the "Line of Control".

On 1 January 1948, India took the issue of Jammu and Kashmir to the United Nations Security Council. In April 1948, the Council passed a resolution calling for Pakistan to withdraw from all of Jammu and Kashmir and for India to reduce its forces to the minimum level, following which a plebiscite would be held to ascertain the people's wishes. However, no withdrawal was ever carried out. India insisted that Pakistan had to withdraw first and Pakistan contended there was no guarantee that India would withdraw afterwards. In 1949, a cease-fire line separating the Indian- and Pakistani-controlled parts of Kashmir was formally put into effect.

Following the 1949 cease-fire agreement, the government of Pakistan divided the northern and western parts of Kashmir, which it held, into the following two separately-controlled political entities; together, both these territories form the Pakistan administered Kashmir region:

1. Azad Jammu and Kashmir (AJK) – the narrow southern part, 250 miles (400 km) long, with a width varying from 10 to 40 miles (16 to 64 km).
2. Gilgit–Baltistan, formerly called the Federally Administered Northern Areas (FANA) – is the much larger area to the north of AJK, 72,496 square kilometres (27,991 sq mi); it was directly administered by Pakistan as a de facto dependent territory, i.e., a non-self-governing territory. However it was officially granted full autonomy on August 29, 2009.

== 1949 to present ==
The new state of Azad Kashmir came to rely heavily on the Pakistani state for support, it initially lacked any urban capital thus areas such as Murree and Rawalpindi, with their army cantonments and accessibility were important. To show the 'indigenous' character of the movement, Azad Kashmiris moved their capital to the thick forests around Palandri, and then to the even thicker forests at Trarkhel, until in 1949 when the 'war-battered' Muzaffarabad became capital. Despite having motivated personnel who operated in familiar environments amongst a supportive population in 1947 there was a lack of educated personnel, especially administrators, in addition to a lack of resources and finance. Pakistan and its army partially alleviated such problems by granting resources and "lending" its own officials as bureaucrats. Christopher Snedden writes that compared to Indian-administered Kashmir, "Azad Kashmir detrimentally became known as a ‘local authority’ with limited power, control and influence, and heavily overseen by Pakistan." Due to the requirements of the scheduled UN plebiscite Pakistan decided to 'administer' its two areas of J&K until the plebiscite determined their status rather than fully and legally incorporating them into Pakistan. Making Azad Kashmir and Gilgit-Baltistan de facto, but not de jure part of Pakistan.

Christopher Snedden adds "Azad Kashmiris quickly, and willingly, accepted the ‘demotion’ of their region, plus more. This was what was required for J&K to join Pakistan," further remarking "Azad Kashmiris enjoyed considerable autonomy." However this state of affairs began to change after the Pakistani Army's official arrival into AJK bringing the Azad Army under its control, subsuming parts of it and disbanding the remainder following the 1949 ceasefire, ending the Kashmiri ability to pursue 'liberation' by itself. Nevertheless, Azad Kashmiris continued to call their region the ‘base camp to liberate [Indian] J&K.' The Pakistani Army even suppressed Azad Kashmiris following an uprising in 1950 and another uprising in 1955, which ended 1956 with the Pak Army launching PC Pak Search Sudhan Operation in Poonch and Rawalakot. The Poonch uprising was triggered over the sacking of Sardar Ibrahim Khan, heavy-handedness and a lack of a plebiscite. Realizing the issue had become more complex, the Government of Pakistan established the Ministry of Kashmir Affairs (MKA) in Rawalpindi. Later becoming the Ministry of Kashmir Affairs and Northern Areas (MKANA) with the addition of Gilgit-Baltistan to its purview.

The Ministry of Kashmir Affairs (MKA) in April 1949 formulated the 'Heads of Agreement' policy between M. A. Gurmani (head of the MKA), Azad Kashmir's President Sardar Ibrahim and Muslim Conference President, Chaudhry Ghulam Abbas. This agreement delineated the responsibilities of the respective parties. Danish Khan describes the Muslim Conference period as a time when the conference remained "engrossed in discourse of Kashmir conflict rather than prioritising the arduous task of institution-building for indigenous/local socio-economic development." "Azad Kashmiris disliked, but endured, MKA officials’ often tardy treatment of them as this was the price to pay to join Pakistan. Equally, Karachi was distant, India was totally unattractive and there were no other options," asserts Snedden. In 1970, Yahya Khan's military administration promulgated a 'rudimentary' constitution, 'The Azad Jammu and Kashmir Government Act, 1970' which provided AJK a presidential system, an elected legislative assembly and 'considerable' autonomy. Snedden refers to it as having "delivered the most autonomy ever enjoyed by this region – or by any region in J&K." The central government only controlling foreign affairs, defence and currency, while the MKA was sidelined.

Zulfikar Ali Bhutto, then Prime-Minister of Pakistan, with some local support imposed the 'Azad Jammu and Kashmir Interim Constitution Act, 1974’ (Interim till the Kashmir dispute was resolved with India). It allowed AJK a directly elected AJK Legislative Assembly, and a smaller indirectly elected Azad Jammu and Kashmir Council in Islamabad. This arrangement reduced the power of the MKA, however Snedden referred to it as a "diminution." Danish Khan in The Friday Times characterizes this development as providing "an avenue for citizens to draw attention from political elites towards immediate socio-economic and developmental concerns such as access to basic infrastructure and public goods," further stating "while public sector investments in infrastructure and social sectors have shown relative improvements over the years, the overarching narrative in the political sphere, spanning across party lines, remains heavily focused on the Jammu & Kashmir conflict rather than indigenous socio-economic development." The Constitution provides Kashmir its own President, Prime-Minister, High Court, Supreme Court, Auditor General and Chief Election Commissioner as well. The 13th Amendment to the AJK Constitution, passed in Muzaffarabad empowered the AJK government, increased the powers of the elected assembly, granted Azad Kashmir greater financial and administrative powers and sought to make the federal territory more autonomous. The word "Act" was also deleted from the Constitution.

Antía Mato Bouzas writes, "Pakistan’s dealings with the Kashmir areas under its control, known at present as Gilgit-Baltistan and AJK, have revolved around two contradictory issues: the need to administer the territories already held, while at the same time persisting in the claim to the whole princely state." This led to the upholding of the colonial status-quo in Gilgit Baltistan, which was ruled under the Frontier Crimes Regulation (FRC) until the 1970s, and less-so in AJK, recognized as a federal territory with its own constitution and semi-autonomous state. Under Zulfikar Ali Bhutto, Gilgit-Baltistan was granted limited-self-administration, the judicial and tax powers of local rulers were removed, and the 'Subject Rule' which legally bound individuals as subjects of the princely state was suppressed, signaling a change from the commitment to the previous status-quo. However, the right to appeal to the High Court of Pakistan and participating in general elections did not materialize. Over time, Gilgit-Baltistan was granted greater degrees of autonomy, with its own regional government and administration, culminating in the Gilgit-Baltistan (Empowerment and Self Governance) Order of 2009, which granted turned its Legislative Council into the Gilgit-Baltistan Assembly, created the Gilgit-Baltistan Council and created the office of Chief Minister of Gilgit-Baltistan elected by the Assembly.

An area of Kashmir that was once under Pakistani control is the Shaksgam tract—a small region along the northeastern border of the Northern Areas that was provisionally ceded by Pakistan to the People's Republic of China in 1963 and which now forms part of China's Uygur Autonomous Region of Xinjiang. The part of Kashmir administered by India currently is divided between Jammu and Kashmir and Ladakh.

In 1972, the then-current border between Pakistan and India, which held areas of Kashmir, was designated as the "Line of Control". The Line of Control has remained unchanged since the 1972 Simla Agreement, which bound the two countries "to settle their differences by peaceful means through bilateral negotiations." Some claim that, in view of that pact, the only solution to the issue is mutual negotiation between the two countries without involving a third party, such as the United Nations.

A devastating earthquake hit Azad Kashmir in 2005.

== United Nations intervention ==
Jawaharlal Nehru, then Prime Minister of India asked the UN to intervene. The United Nations passed the United Nations Security Council Resolution 47 and later United Nations Security Council Resolution 80, which asked Pakistan to withdraw all its forces and India to withdraw most of its forces from Kashmir simultaneously. This was to be followed by a plebiscite to determine the wishes of people of the entire state of Kashmir. However, the required withdrawal never happened. The area which remained under the control of Pakistan is called Azad Kashmir. India took over two-thirds of Kashmir without withdrawing their forces. Pakistan citing India did not withdraw their forces also did not withdraw its forces from Kashmir and controls one third of Kashmir.

== Constitutional status ==
Elections were held to the 49-seat Legislative Assembly of Azad Kashmir on July 11 to the eighth Legislative Assembly since 1970 (seventh since 1974 when Pakistan granted the region a parliamentary system with adult franchise). Azad Kashmir is categorised as an autonomous region, but critics claim titles such as Prime Minister and President for the region's elected political leadership are misleading as candidates are required to sign an affidavit of allegiance to Kashmir's accession to Pakistan.

On September 14, 1994, the Supreme Court of Azad Kashmir ruled that "the Northern areas are a part of J&K State but are not a part of Azad J&K as defined in the Interim Constitution Act 1974". The Northern Areas presently has no officially named status in Pakistan. Pakistan does not consider this area as a "province" of Pakistan or as a part of "Azad Kashmir". They are ruled directly from Islamabad through a Northern Areas Council. A chief executive (usually a retired Pakistani army officer), appointed by Islamabad is the local administrative head. This area presently has no representatives in both the Azad Kashmir Assembly and in Pakistan's parliament. Northern Areas’ Legislative Council was created with a membership of 29 (later increased to 32), but its powers are restricted. On May 11, 2007, the NA's chief executive, who also happens to be the Minister for Kashmir Affairs and Northern Areas Affairs, declared that the region had a right to be represented in the National Assembly. Others demand that it should be given the status of a province. The changes made in 1994 in the local bodies’ ordinance gave more representation to women and delegated some administrative and financial powers to the local administration. However, the people of the region do not enjoy fundamental rights, because it continues to be governed by the Legal Framework Order of 1994.

== Azad Kashmir Day ==
Azad Kashmir Day celebrates the first day of the Azad Jammu Kashmir government, created on 24 October 1947.

== See also ==
- History of Gilgit-Baltistan
- History of Kashmir

Kashmir Region

- Leh
- Siachen Glacier
- Skardu

Conflict related

- Indo-Pakistani wars and conflicts
- Kashmir conflict
- Line of Actual Control (LAC) – dividing Indian and Chinese administered territories
- Pakistan and state-sponsored terrorism
- Sino-Indian War
