= 1837 Poonch Revolt =

Revolt in Poonch in 1837

- Part of Kashmir Conflict
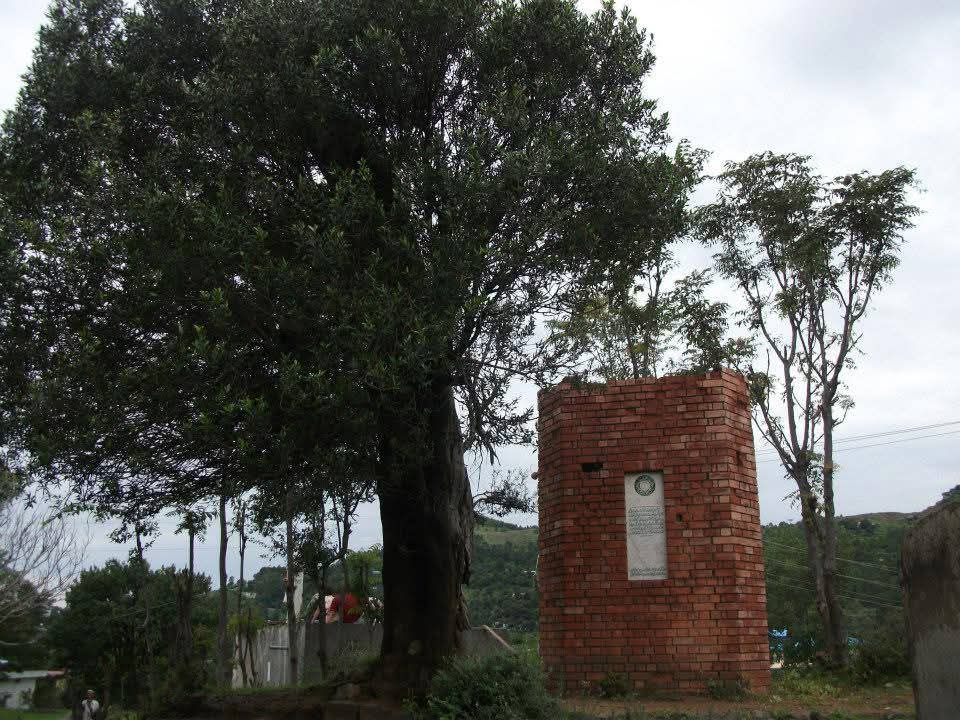
- Yaadghar-e-Shahuda (memorial for martyrs) for sardars Sabz Ali, Mali Khan and other chieftains, located in Mang, Sudhanoti.
Date	1837
Location	Poonch
Result	Rebellion suppressed, Poonch's merger with the Sikh Empire

Belligerents
Maldial (Maldyal); Sudhan	Sikh Empire; Dogra Dynasty

Commanders and leaders
Shams Khan †; Malli Khan †; Sabz Ali Khan †	Gulab Singh; Dhian Singh; Mihan Singh; Zorawar Singh Kahluria

The 1837 Poonch Revolt, also known as the 1837 Sudhan Revolt was a revolt in the western Poonch hills in the Kashmir region under the Sikh Empire. It started in what is now the Poonch Division in Azad Kashmir administered by Pakistan, with the rebels capturing areas of the Poonch and Jammu jagirs, alongside some bordering frontiers of the Kashmir Valley. The region was given as a jagir to the Dogra brothers, Dhian Singh and Gulab Singh, whose administration was effectively the target of the rebellion. After initial successes and victories against Dogra and Sikh forces, the rebellion was crushed by Gulab Singh with brutality. A memorial for the victims called Yaadghar-e-Shahuda has been erected at Mong after the formation of Azad Kashmir.

== History ==
In 1819, when the Sikh Empire conquered the Kashmir Valley from the Saddozai Kingdom, the Poonch Town was taken, but the western hills of Poonch were not subdued. In the western parts (modern day Poonch Division of Azad Kashmir) the local tribes had entrenched themselves within the hills.

In 1837 Poonch revolt was led under the leadership of a zamindar Shamas Khan who belongs to Maldial (Maldyal) tribe or Sudhan tribe. After Gulab Singh received Jammu as a jagir (autonomous territory), he made renewed attempts at conquering Poonch, but the armies he raised were not large enough to defeat the resistance, and consequently he would face defeats before being forced to withdraw.

In 1832, Gulab Singh and his brother Dhian Singh made an appeal to Ranjit Singh, requesting him to put an end to the resistance of Poonch. Their appeal was accepted, and Ranjit Singh attacked Poonch with an army numbering up to sixty-thousand, bringing with him an assortment of hill-cannons. The hill-cannons were particularly deadly, damaging the local fortifications with ease. Initially, the tribal coalition had made the decision to resist the Sikhs, however after realizing the overwhelming superiority of the Sikh forces and inevitability of a defeat, the tribal coalition approached Ranjit Singh with a peace agreement, in which they would acknowledge his suzerainty over the western Poonch hills, which Ranjit accepted. As was tradition, since the Sudhan led coalition had approached for peace before any combat had occurred, they would be allowed to retain autonomy over the region and Shams Khan and the other sardars were not deprived of their rulership, but were now subject to the Sikh Empire, with taxes being established. The conquest ended without any significant bloodshed.

The leader of the coalition, Shams Khan and his family had been taken as hostages, as part of the peace agreement, and relocated to Lahore, where Shams would have representation in the Sikh court and manage the affairs of his tribe from there. He was given to the care of Dhian Singh, who began to grow a liking for him.

Despite the peace agreement with Ranjit, Gulab Singh and Dhian Singh had intentions to incorporate the autonomous state into Poonch, through which they could have full control over it, which created tensions between the tribals and the Dogras. In the year 1836, Shams had arrived home from the court of Dhian Singh with his permission, and began to rally support with the local tribes. At around the same time, the Yusufzai had begun a revolt against the Sikh Empire, the leader of the Dogras Gulab Singh had to march to Peshawar deal with the threat.

In 1837, the significant Battle of Jamrud occurred. The battle did not have a clear victor, but Hari Singh Nalwa, a respected and valued general of the Sikh Empire whom took part in the conquest of Kashmir and other regions had been killed. Rumors of the death of Gulab Singh in the campaign too sprung up, alongside that of a total Sikh defeat which promoted dissidence in Poonch, as the locals now believed that the empire was crumbling. Taking advantage of this, Shams backed clashes between the local militias and Sikh garrisons. Gulab Singh became aware of Shams involvement, and issued a warrant for the arrest of him and his family. Shams eluded the chasing authorities.

After this, an all-out rebellion broke out. The rebels attacked and captured several forts, defeating the local garrisons and forces. Seeking independence from Dogra rule, the rebellion by the Sudhans eventually incited local Muslim hill-tribes of the Poonch region to also rebel. Gulab Singh ordered his son Udham Singh to suppress the revolt before it grew further in strength. Udham Singh arrived with a Dogra force of five thousand troops, which was joined by generals Zorawar Singh and Labh Singh, who reinforced the army with their troops and elite Marzban soldiers, however the force was defeated by rebels commandeered by Shams and his lieutenants. The prince and commanders were able to escape with some remnants of the army, but now Poonch was laid bare to the rebels.

Assaults over local forts continued, resulting in significant success. The garrisons were caught off-guard and ill-prepared, and fell to the attacking rebel armies. Some soldiers of the garrisons were cut-up with their corpses fed to dogs, with the justification given by the rebels that they had treated the locals with cruelty and committed crimes against them in the prior occupation. The rebels additionally captured the regions of the Poonch jagir east of the heartland of the rebels, alongside areas from the Jammu jagir and bordering frontiers of the Kashmir Valley. According to the Gulabnama of Diwan Kirpa Ram, Shams Khan purportedly imprisoned Mian Chain Singh, the Dogra appointed police-chief (Thanadari) of Poonch and forced him to eat foods forbidden in Hinduism.

Following the defeats, Gulab Singh quickly forced the Yusufzai into peace, and then marched to Kahuta, where he raised an army of eight thousand regular infantry and twelve thousand irregulars. Though Gulab had raised a sizeable and professional army, he chose not to engage the rebellion immediately, seeking to weaken the rebellion by utilizing the diversity of the various tribes that were in areas now under rebel control to promote disunion and division among the rebellion. He focused on bribing local Sardars of the various tribes and the many enemies of Shams, promising lavish rewards or positions of power if they betrayed Shams and the rebels. This either neutralized them as foes, or turned a small number to his side completely, resulting in them aiding Gulab with either information or later fighting against the rebels. Gulab also incited infighting between Shams and his enemies, which further occupied and divided the rebel forces. Thus Gulab had successfully incited treachery and infighting within ranks of the rebellion.

After this, Gulab made his way to Poonch through Jhelum, and after some initial victories against local tribes, he paved way towards the Sudhan heartland, aiming to defeat the Sudhans who were both the leaders of the rebellion and made up the majority of its forces. Major clashes occurred at Pallandri, Pallangi, Pachhiot, Paral, Panthal, Baral, Narian and Chokian, alongside smaller clashes in other areas. The deadliest battle occurred in the Sudhan stronghold of Mong, where the local Sudhans both dealt and received heavy casualties. Although the rebels temporarily pushed out occupying Dogra forces in some areas, with the aid of Sikh reinforcements, Gulab counterattacked and overwhelmed the rebels. After the fall of Mong, many Sudhan commanders and notables were captured, including two sardars (scions) Malli Khan and Sabz Ali Khan, whom alongside Shams were at the head of both the tribe and the rebellion. Thus the remaining rebels had also lost key leaders.

To spread terror throughout the ranks of the rebels, Gulab Singh devastated all captured territories, permitting total plunder and terror in great excess. He also set a reward of five rupees for the head of every insurgent and anyone that was connected to him, regardless of age or gender. The remaining rebels were outmatched both in number and arms. Realizing the hopelessness of the situation, the rebellion began to collapse as rebels raced to protect their own families. Though the majority of the local population managed to escape Gulab's forces by taking refuge in nearby hills, their homes were looted, fields destroyed and cattle seized. Those who could not escape were either massacred or enslaved.

The captured sardars Sabz Ali Khan and Malli Khan were flayed alive, alongside other commanders and notable members of the Sudhans and other rebellious tribes. After eliminating any remaining resistance around the areas of Mong and Pallandri, Gulab Singh's forces then headed towards Bagh, where the remaining rebels had been rallied by Shams. Gulab had also sent forces under Wazir Zorawar Kahluria, and Labh Singh, through another route to attack the rebels. After Gulab landed near Bagh, Shams had a false report sent to him stating that the forces under Zorawar and Labh had been defeated by the rebels, which caused Gulab to retreat from Bagh.

The forces of Zorawar Singh and Labh Singh still engaged the remaining rebels in Bagh despite Gulab's retreat and defeated the rebels they encountered. After his retreat, Gulab concluded that the report was a ploy by Shams, and news of the forces under Zorawar and Labh defeating the rebels arrived to him. Shams hiding place was then exposed to the Dogras, which led to an ambush at night, where he was beheaded, alongside his nephew Rajwali. As a result, the remnants of the rebellion which were concentrated in Bagh also collapsed as the main leader of the rebels was now dead.

The heads of Shams and his nephew were later put in two cages of iron at the very top of the Adha Dek pass. As all ring leaders were now either dead or captured, any remaining insurgents now in hiding, alongside no remaining resistance, the conflict was concluded and Gulab withdrew his forces.

== Aftermath ==
Major G. Carmichael Smyth estimated in his 1847 The History Of Reigning Family Of Lahore that approximately 14,000 to 15,000 of the population of the region including the rebels and non-combatants perished by the end of the conflict. Sir Lepel Henry Griffin in the 1865 The Panjab Chiefs stated that although there could be some exaggeration in numbers, 12,000 perished by the end of the conflict followed by an undocumented number of many in the ensuing famine due to the death of men leaving many areas unable to till their fields. Smyth also estimated the local populations before the conflict to approximately be 40,000 for the Sudhans and 18,000 for the Murdiall, Doondh and Suthe tribes who also lived in the region of Poonch neighboring the Sudhans and started their own rebellion against the Sikh and Dogra administration after the substantial successes in the early stages of the revolt by the Sudhans.

Although the overall majority of the local populace of Poonch, Sudhans and other rebellious tribes had survived by taking refuge in the hills, a substantial percentage of the overall population had been killed by the end of the conflict. The survivors returned home to barren fields and ransacked homes, alongside the deaths or disappearances of many relatives, including non-combatants and those who had nothing to do with the rebellion. Widespread famine occurred throughout the region, due to the uncultivated fields and the sowing season already over by the time the Dogra and Sikh forces withdrew, causing further devastation and undocumented casualties. Many of the locals were forced to temporarily seek refuge in neighboring areas across the Jhelum River, in areas now in modern-day Pakistan, where some families reportedly sold their children to allow survival. The cruelty shown by the Dogra forces was not forgotten, with British contemporaries being appalled at the treatment of the rebellious tribes and the people of Poonch as a whole by Gulab. In 1846, after the Dogra Kingdom of Jammu and Kashmir was created and became a princely state of the British, Gulab Singh was forced to address the issue of his cruelty. He claimed that the actions of him and his forces in the "Suodan country" were vengeance for the treatment the rebels imposed upon Dogra garrisons, and that he had only flayed alive three ring-leaders, though the locals claimed otherwise. To appease the British, he requested an advisor by whose counsel he would avoid further tyrannical action.

Contemporary British commentators stated that the local population suffered immensely. Captured rebels were treated vengefully — their hands and feet were severed. The skins of chieftains Mali Khan and Sabz Ali Khan Sudhan, two of Shams's close accomplices and lieutenants, were peeled off their bodies and their heads were hung on a gallows in a crossroad to deter others.

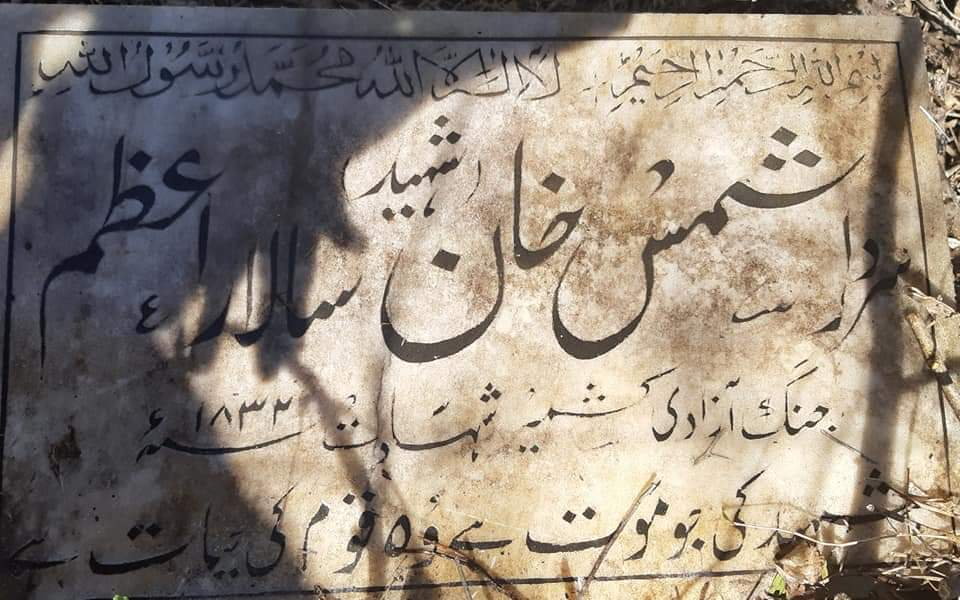
Graveyard plaques of 18th-century Shams Khan in Poonch,

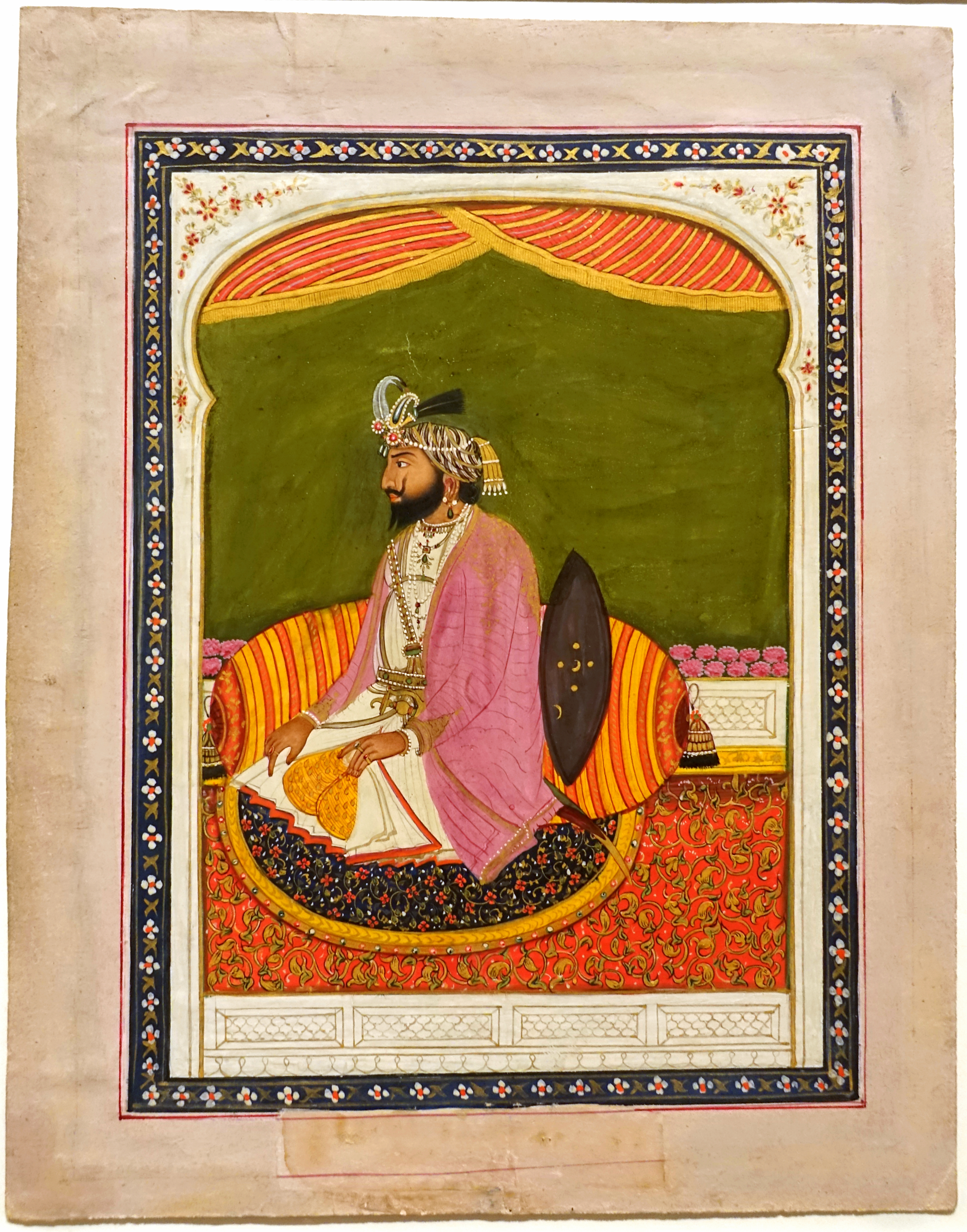
Portrait of Raja Dhian Singh in opaque watercolor and gold on exhibit at the Tokyo National Museum. c. mid 19th century.
