= Sudhan (disambiguation) =

Sudhan may refer to:

- Sudhan Gali a village in Bagh District
- PC Pak Search Sudhan Operation a Pakistani military operation against Sudhan tribe
- Sudhan Tribe, a tribe of Poonch, Azad Kashmir
- Sudhan-noti, a district in Azad Kashmir
