= Siege of Mirpur =

Part of the First Kashmir War in 1947

- Part of the Indo-Pakistani war of 1947–1948 and Kashmir conflict
Date	Mirpur City: 15 Oct – 25 Nov 1947; Mangla fort: 15 Oct – 24 Dec 1947
Location	Old Mirpur, Jammu and Kashmir 33.1834°N 73.7837°E
Result	Siege Successful: State forces abandon Mirpur; Mirpur falls to Azad army
Territorial changes	Mirpur becomes part of the territory administered by Pakistan, known as Azad Jammu and Kashmir (AJK)

Belligerents
(Azad Kashmir) Azad Army; Supported by Pakistan	Dominion of India: Jammu and Kashmir

Units involved
(Azad Kashmir) Azad Army (Note: Also referred to as the Mujahideen): Tribal militias; Muslim deserters (Note: the Muslim troops of Jammu and Kashmir state forces had defected to Azad army side); Pakistani volunteers	Jammu and Kashmir State Forces: Mirpur Brigade; Local militias; Indian Air Force

Strength
Two infantry battalions	≈ 610–560 men
- Location within Kashmir

The siege of Mirpur was a military operation initiated by Pakistan-backed Azad Kashmir rebels against the garrison of the city of Mirpur in the princely state of Jammu and Kashmir. It began on 15 October 1947, during the First Kashmir War, with the objective of capturing the city in support of its accession to Pakistan.

Following the capture of Bhimber, the Azad Army considered it necessary to seize Mirpur and neutralize the threat posed by the Jammu and Kashmir state forces stationed there. By 15 October, the Azad forces had come under attack from the Mirpur and Poonch garrisons, and some Muslim troops reportedly defected from the state forces to join the Azad forces.

The outer defensive posts of Mirpur were eliminated, and communication with the Mangla Mai fort was severed. The Azad Army rapidly mobilized its forces before the Indian Army could intervene, while the state forces maintained their positions, awaiting reinforcements. Khan Muhammad Khan and Captain Afzal led the effort to dismantle the outposts and launched an assault on the town. However, they withdrew due to heavy shelling and continuous strafing by the Indian Air Force.

In the meantime, tribesmen and volunteers from Poonch arrived to assist the Azad Army, bringing captured ammunition and three-inch mortars.

On 24 November, the Azad Army launched an offensive and overran the post in the southwestern part of the city. After six hours of combat, the state forces' resistance collapsed.

Due to dwindling ammunition supplies, the senior officers of the Jammu and Kashmir state forces decided to abandon the city and evacuate civilians to a safer location. At Mangla Mai, the garrison held out against the Azad forces for one month and twenty days, until the fort' gate was destroyed by sustained bombardment. The garrison, now encircled, capitulated.

With the fall of Mirpur tehsil, the route to Jhangar became unsecured, and military operations in Kotli tehsil continued thereafter. On 25 May 1949, prisoners from the Jammu and Kashmir state forces were repatriated after being held at Ali Beg for ten months.

== Background ==
After capturing Bhimber, the Azad Army targeted Mirpur to neutralize Jammu and Kashmir state forces stationed there. By October 1947, Muslim troops from the state forces defected, weakening Mirpur's defenses. The Azad Army severed communications with Mangla Fort and advanced to the city's outskirts. On 15 October, Azad forces attacked the Mirpur and Poonch garrisons, and by 18 October, Muslim troops from the Jammu and Kashmir state forces had defected.

By this point, the Azad forces had surrounded both Poonch and the city of Mirpur. Due to the desertion of Muslim troops from the state forces, the security situation deteriorated. The situation in Poonch improved after an air link was established. Dadyal and Chechian posts were abandoned, with two platoons stationed at Phala-da-Gala to maintain surveillance. A vehicle that had been ordered to bring aid was ambushed, and the two platoons were withdrawn to Mirpur following the dispatch of a relief team.

The withdrawal of forward platoons from Phala-da-Gala severed communications with the Mangla Mai garrison and allowed the Azad forces to advance to the outskirts of Mirpur, making the town more accessible. Recognizing that their advantage depended on capturing Mirpur before reinforcements from the Indian Army could arrive, the Azad forces quickly mobilized and launched a major assault on the town on 6 November. Meanwhile, the state forces, anticipating imminent support from the Indian Army, held their positions in an effort to prevent the fall of Mirpur.

== Siege ==
The outer posts in the Mirpur area had been eliminated by Azad forces, and the remaining Jammu and Kashmir state forces had entrenched themselves in the town of Mirpur. A relief column from Nowshera was dispatched by the Indian Army to support the state forces but was ambushed, suffered heavy losses, and was unable to advance further.

Captain Muhammad Khan and Captain Afzal effectively eliminated the outposts and led an attack on the town, but withdrew due to heavy shelling and constant strafing by the Indian Air Force. In the meantime, tribesmen and volunteers from Poonch city arrived to aid the Azad Army, bringing captured ammunition and three-inch mortars. These mortars were used by Azad troops to shell the city at night

On 20 November, Azad forces attacked and gained control of the southwestern portion of the city. However, they were pushed back after a night of skirmishes with reserve forces commanded by Lieutenant Krishen Singh. The wireless set available to the garrison ceased functioning, and the Indian Air Force did not carry out further strikes, allowing Azad forces to intensify their attacks.

On 24 November, the Azad Army launched an offensive that eliminated the post in the southwestern part of the city. After six hours of battle, resistance collapsed. Most of the city came under fire, and Azad forces continued to enter from the southwest. All posts held by the Jammu and Kashmir state forces came under attack, and the city was eventually overwhelmed.

=== State forces abandon Mirpur city ===
As Azad Army troops entered the city, emergency signals were sent to Indian aircraft overhead. In response to the worsening situation and depleted ammunition, senior officers of the Jammu and Kashmir state forces decided to abandon the city and evacuate civilians to a safer area. Panic ensued, and many Mirpuri civilians reportedly took their own lives as rumors of the evacuation spread. Of approximately 18,000 civilians, only 15,000 were able to join the retreat, leaving about 3,000 behind in Mirpur.

The combined column of civilians and state troops began retreating towards Jhangar. A small company was left behind to stall the Azad troops with addition of two jets of the Indian air force, which bombarded Azad army positions. The column on its way faced heavy fire from an Azad army positions and scattered, after regrouping the Azad guides were forced to lead the column. The guides would deceive and escape from the state forces and again the column was met with heavy Azad army resistance.

Map of Azad Kashmir with the Mirpur District highlighted in red

The Indian Air Force provided air cover during the retreat, with jets intermittently targeting Azad positions to aid the column's movement. An elderly man was recruited as a guide. Initially mistaking the column for Azad forces, he ultimately cooperated after realizing their identity. The rear guard remained engaged in combat throughout the day and suffered 15 casualties on 26 November. The column reached Jhangar by 28 November.

=== Siege of Mangla Mai fort ===
From 18 October, the garrison at Mangla Mai Fort came under continuous fire from Azad troops. On 7 November, an elderly woman took refuge in the fort, claiming that Mirpur had fallen and that many civilians, including her family, had been killed. She carried two letters; one for the fort's commander Jemadar Khajoor Singh, and another for a civilian inside the fort.

One letter, written in Urdu, and the other in English, were signed by Captain Mohamed Azam, a Jammu and Kashmir state forces officer. They instructed the garrison to surrender. However, the messages were ignored.

The garrison consisted of Commander Jemadar Khajoor Singh, Havildar Ishri Singh, three other fort personnel, and civilian Mirpuris. While there was a sufficient supply of gunpowder and a stockpile of antique muzzleloaders, ammunition was scarce. The Mirpuri defenders reportedly used pebbles as makeshift projectiles. Water and food were also in short supply, and small groups were sent to fetch water from the river. All escape routes were blocked by Azad forces, and the fort came under mortar attack, while the Indian Air Force ceased providing support.

On the night of 23–24 November, an attempted escape toward Mirpur failed when the group was spotted and some members were captured. The garrison held out for one month and twenty days until, on 25 December, the fort's gate was destroyed by Azad bombardment. Commander Khajoor Singh ordered the weapons destroyed and attempted to evacuate, but the fort was surrounded. The garrison and the commander capitulated to the Azad forces and the garrison was kept in the fort for another 20 days. They were taken to Ali Beg with other 3,600 Mirpuri refugees at the holy buildings attempted to escape but were captured again and killed.

== Aftermath ==
The Azad forces reportedly handed over the cash found in the Mirpur treasury to their authorities to strengthen their military operations. In Jhangar, Captain Afzal was killed in action, and the village of Gobindpur, located in Mirpur, was renamed Afzalpur in his honor. With the fall of Mirpur tehsil, the route to Jhangar remained unguarded, and military operations in Kotli tehsil continued. Following the collapse of outposts in the Kotli region, two companies of Jammu and Kashmir state forces were dispatched from Rawalakot to Kotli, responding to urgent appeals for reinforcements.

On 26 November, the 50 Para Brigade returned to Jhangar from Kotli and assumed control of the area. Meanwhile, the disbanded Mirpur Brigade regrouped at Jhangar. A column composed of Jammu and Kashmir state forces and refugees from Mirpur, Kotli, and Jhangar was formed and began moving toward Jammu on 29 November. The Red Cross negotiated the release of 2,800 survivors, who had been detained at Ali Beg for five months. Reports indicate that many other detainees died due to starvation or torture, According to Palit, detainees at Ali Beg included women who were segregated and later reported abuse by Azad officers.

== See also ==
- Partition of India
- Kashmir conflict
  - Indo-Pakistani War of 1947–1948
  - 1947-48 India-Pakistan battles and operations

== Sources ==
=== Works cited ===
- Ankit, Rakesh (2010). "1948: The Crucial Year in the History of Jammu and Kashmir". Economic and Political Weekly. 45 (11): 49–58. ISSN 0012-9976. JSTOR 25664224.
- Cheema, Amar (2014). The Crimson Chinar the Kashmir Conflict : a Politico Military Perspective. United Service Institution of India. ISBN 9788170623014.
- Gulati, M. N. (2000). Military Plight of Pakistan: Indo-Pak War, 1947–48, Volume 1. Vol. 1. Manas Publications. ISBN 9788170491231 – via archive.org.
- Palit, D. K. (1972). Jammu and Kashmir Arms: History of the J & K Rifles. Palit & Dutt. ASIN B0006C8HKM – via archive.
- Prasad, Sri Nandan (1987). History of Operations in Jammu & Kashmir, 1947–48. History Division, Ministry of Defence, Government of India – via archive.org.
- Riza, Shaukat (1997). The Pakistan Army 1947–1949. natraj publishers. ISBN 978-8185019635.
- Saraf, Muhammad Yusuf (2015) [first published 1979 by Ferozsons], Kashmiris Fight for Freedom, Volume 2, Mirpur: National Institute Kashmir Studies, archived from the original on 2021-03-29
- Sen, L. P. (1994). Slender was the Thread: Kashmir Confrontation 1947–1948. Sangam Books Limited. ISBN 9780861316922.
- Sinha, S.K. (1977). Operation Rescue Military Operations in Jammu & Kashmir, 1947–49. Vision Books. Archived from the original on 2021-01-20.
- Singh, K.Brahma (1990). History of Jammu and Kashmir Rifles, 1820–1956 The State Force Background (Hardcover). Lancer International. ISBN 9788170620914.
  - Singh, K. Brahma (2010) [first published Lancer International 1990], History of Jammu and Kashmir Rifles, 1820–1956: The State Force Background (PDF), brahmasingh.co.nf, ISBN 978-81-7062-091-4, archived from the original (PDF) on 6 March 2016
- Suharwardy, Abdul Haq (1983), Tragedy in Kashmir, Wajidalis

Preceded by Bhimber raid	Battles of the Indo-Pakistani war of 1947; Siege of Mirpur	Succeeded by Siege of Kotli
