= Mongriot =

Mongriot is a village situated in the Sudhanoti district of Pakistan, about 10 kilometres (6.2 mi) east of Pallandri. The population is around 500 to 600 people.

== Weather ==
The weather of this village is cold in winter but pleasant in summer. The temperature does not exceed to 27-28 in summer.

== Culture ==
Most of the houses are made of mud. People wear the regional dress which is shalwr and qameez. People speak the native language, Pahari. People eat simple food like vegetables, ghee, and butter, which they produce themselves.

== Occupation ==
Mostly people are related with agricultural production. But some people are related with teaching field and some people join army.
