= Motialmara =

Village Rawalakot, Pakistan

Motialmara is a village in Azad Kashmir, Pakistan approximately 2.4 km northeast of Rawalakot. It is located in a valley surrounded by snow-capped mountains

== Population ==
Approximately 12,000 people live in this village, over 90% to the Sudhan tribe remaining include Pashtun immigrants who are shop keepers and refugees from Indian administered Kashmir.

== Occupation ==
Most of the population located in this district live on subsistence farming. Some of the population has migrated to England and the United States. However, quite a few work in the Middle East, and these are temporary workers.

== Notable people ==
Sardar Imtiaz Khan leading social gathering in NJ

Sardar Imtiaz Khan is a political and social leader who leads the Kashmiri Community in New Jersey and New York. He is a philanthropist and has helped build the Islamic Center in New Jersey.
