= Khan Muhammad Khan of Mang =

Pakistani military officer and guerrilla leader (1919–1995)

Khan Muhammad Khan
- خان محمد خان
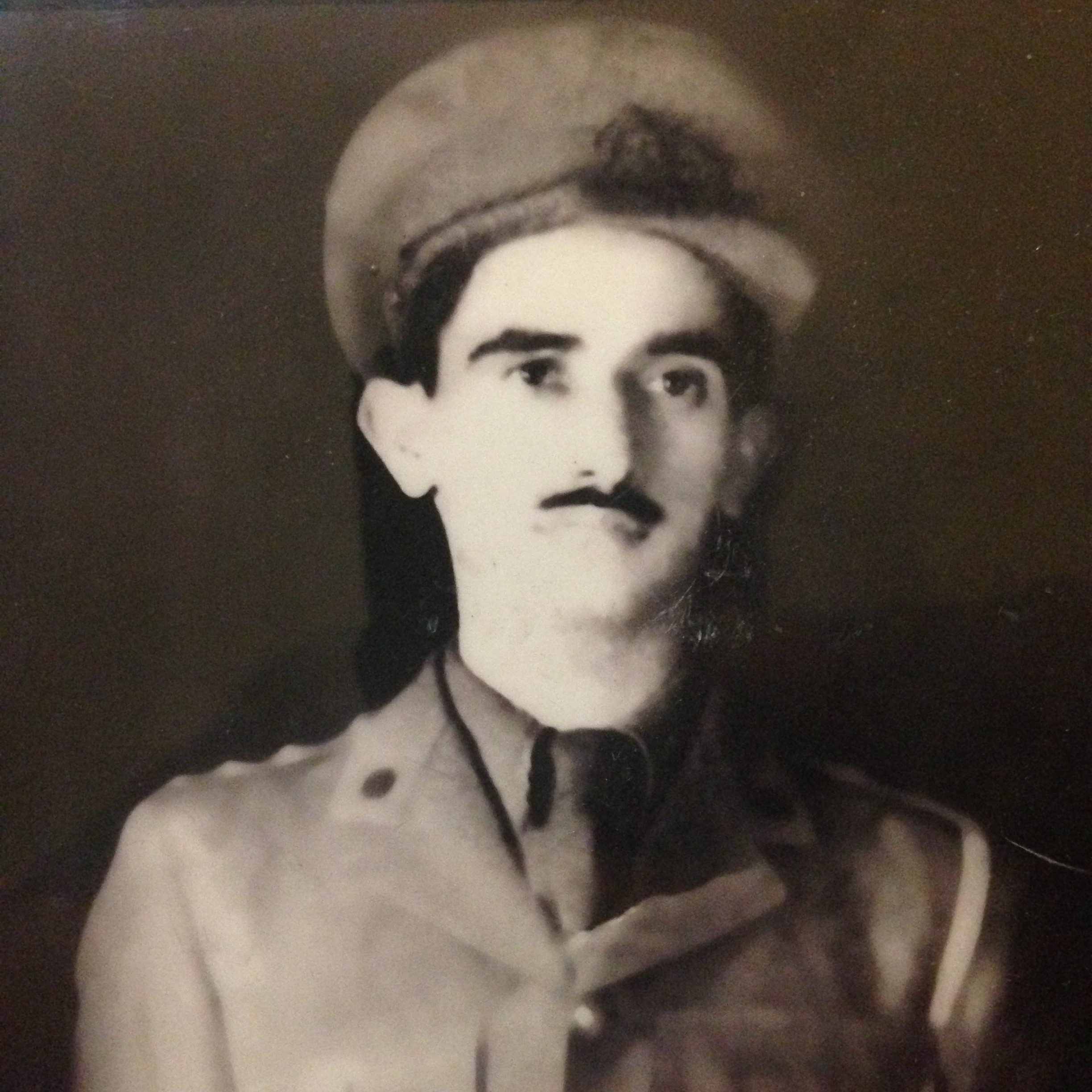
- Born: 25 April 1919; Mang, Jammu and Kashmir, British India (now in Azad Kashmir)
- Died: 11 June 1995 (aged 76); Sudhanoti, Azad Jammu and Kashmir, Pakistan
- Other name: Khan of Mang
- Citizenship: Azad Jammu and Kashmir (post-1947); Jammu Kashmir (pre-1947)
- Occupations: Soldier and guerrilla leader
- Military career
- Allegiance: British India (1938–1947); Azad Kashmir Regular Force (1947–1955)
- Branch: infantry
- Rank: Captain
- Unit: 1st Punjab Regiment (1938–1947) Azad Kashmir Regular Force (1947–1955)
- Commands: (3rd Battalion of 1st Punjab Regiment) (24 Azad Kashmir Battalion)
- Known for: Leading the Mirpur front during the 1947 War of Independence (AJ&K)
- Conflicts: Second world war 1947 Poonch rebellion First Kashmir War 1955 Poonch uprising (POW)

Khan Muhammad Khan (Urdu: خان محمد خان; 25 April 1912 – June 1995) commonly known as Khan of Mang, was a prominent Sudhan soldier and politician in Poonch, serving a captain in the 1st Punjab Regiment of the British Indian Army during World War II. After demobilisation, he served as a rebel leader during the First Kashmir War; and is credited with the Siege of Mirpur.

He was also allegedly involved with the Rawalpindi Conspiracy and the Poonch Uprising.

== Biography ==
Khan Muhammad Khan was born on 25 April 1919 in Mang, in the Poonch District of the princely state of Jammu and Kashmir, in British India, to Alam Sher Khan, a local dignitary. He joined the British Indian Army and received his commission in 1938. He was with Fusiliers for 18 months and served as a King's Commissioned Indian Officer for 2 years. He participated in World War II and was posted to 3rd Battalion of 1st Punjab Regiment in the Middle East and Italy.

Khan took part in the First Kashmir War as a rebel leader. He was active in the Mirpur sector. He led the Mirpur campaign and later raised the 24 Azad Kashmir Battalion (Khan) of the Azad Kashmir Regiment.

According to his personal memoirs, during the 1955 Poonch uprising against the state of Azad Jammu and Kashmir, Khan of Mang was involved in the rallying of support for the movement. He fled to Indian-administered Kashmir and was later accused by Pakistan Government of being a double agent, attempting to gather resources and ammunition to instigate a movement against the state. Upon return from India, he was imprisoned by Pakistan in Haripur District for 10 years.

== See also ==
- Sher Khan
