= Baloch Tehsil =

Tehsil in Azad Kashmir, Pakistan

Baloch Tehsil تحصیل بلوچ
- Tehsil
- Location within Azad Kashmir Location within Pakistan
- Coordinates: 33.6461°N 73.8156°E
- Administering country: Pakistan
- Territory: Azad Kashmir
- Division: Poonch
- District: Sudhanoti

Area
  - Total: 175 km^{2} (68 sq mi)

Population (2017)
  - Total: 96,724
  - Density: 553/km^{2} (1,430/sq mi)
- Time zone: UTC+5 (PKT)

Baloch Tehsil (Urdu: تحصیل بلوچ) is a tehsil of Sudhanoti District in Azad Kashmir, a part of Kashmir administered by Pakistan.

== Administration ==
Baloch Tehsil is one of four tehsils (subdistricts) belonging to Sudhanoti District in Azad Kashmir, a part of Kashmir administered by Pakistan. The other three are Mong, Pallandri, and Tarar Khel. There are 17 villages under the jurisdiction of Baloch Tehsil.

== Demographics ==
The 2017 Pakistani census recorded 96,724 people living in 15,238 households in Baloch.
