= Pakhar, Rawalakot =

Town in Poonch Division, Azad Kashmir, Pakistan

Pakhar is a town in Rawalakot Tehsil (20 km from Rawalakot), Poonch district, in Pakistan-administered Azad Kashmir. It covers an area about 5.1 km².
