= Khan Muhammad Khan =

Sudhan soldier and politician (1882–1961)

Colonel Khan Muhammad Khan Baba-e-Poonch
- کرنل خان محمد خان
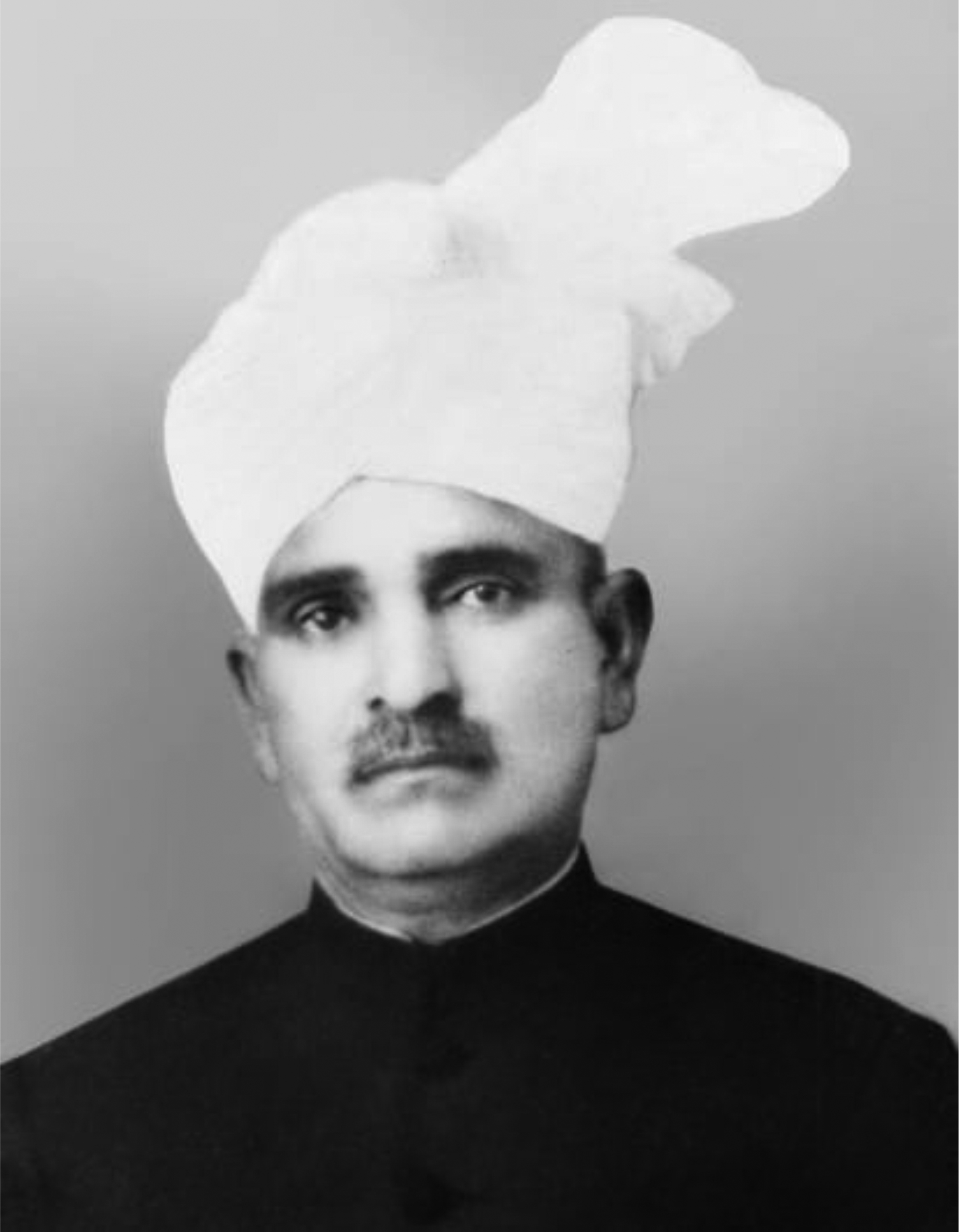
- Born: 1 January 1882; Khanabad, Sudhanoti, Jammu and Kashmir, British India
- Died: 11 November 1961 (aged 81); Sudhanoti, Azad Jammu and Kashmir, Pakistan
- Citizenship: Azad Jammu and Kashmir (post-1947); Jammu Kashmir (pre-1947)
- Occupations: Soldier and politician Jammu & Kashmir Member Legislative Assembly in 1934-1946
- Known for: Founding the Sudhan Educational Conference; Chairman of the War Council during the 1947 War of Independence (AJ&K)
- Children: Ali Muhammad (son); Naqi Khan (son); Abdul Qayyum Khan (son); Khalida Khanum (daughter); Adeeba Khanum (daughter)
- Family: Sudhan
- Awards: Indian Distinguished Service Medal; Khansahib

Colonel Khan Muhammad Khan (Urdu: کرنل خان محمد خان) was a prominent Sudhan soldier and politician in Poonch, serving in the Legislative Assembly (Praja Sabha) of the princely state of Jammu & Kashmir until 1947. Later he served as the Chairman of the War Council during the 1947 Poonch Rebellion (regarded as the "War of Independence" by the Sudhan Poonchis).

== Early life and career ==
Khan Muhammad Khan was born in 1882, in a village called Chhachhan (now Khan Abad) in the Sudhanoti tehsil of the Poonch jagir to an elite Sudhan family. After learning Quran at home, he went to school in Kahuta (Rawalpindi district) at age 10. After the completion of primary school, he joined the British Indian Army in 1902.

Khan participated in World War I, receiving the Indian Distinguished Service Medal (IDSM). He retired from the Army with the rank of Subedar-major.

After retirement from the army, Khan was employed as the police inspector of Poonch by the Raja Baldev Singh. Khan served in this post until 1924, after which he engaged in social welfare activities.

== Activism ==
In the beginning of the 20th century, certain social and educational organization emerged in different regions of Jammu & Kashmir. Their basic objective was to remove the injurious and un-Islamic customs and traditions from the society through the mode of peaceful conversion and educating the young generation. On the same pattern, a socio-educational movement was initiated in Poonch jagir region by Khan Muhammad Khan in the early 1930s; however, he considered education as the most significant instrument for the improvement of the society. It was the need of hour as the ratio of education amongst the Muslims in Poonch jagir was just around 2% as compared to 5% in the rest of Jammu & Kashmir while the condition in the villages was at its level worst Regarding the promotion of education, he started an educational campaign in 1934.

He organized a meeting of the women of the region at Dhar Drach, a village near Pallandri. In that particular meeting, he focused his talk around the education of girls and asked them to support his educational project through a first of flour surplus on daily basics After the verbal commitment of those women, Khan launched "Muthi Bhar Atta Funding Scheme" (shortly Muthi Bhar Atta Scheme) on the pattern of Anjuman-e-Humayat-e-Islam. Under this funding scheme, a handful of each family's flour was collected on a weekly basis and used to fund projects such as the constructions of the (Jamia Mosque) and the Darul Allum Madrassa at Pallandri which was serving as a school of religious education in the region.

After the successful completion of the Jamia Masjid and the Darul Alum he extended the educational campaign Soon Khan Sahib succeed in forming the committee of notables to work for the promotion of education in the region, In order to promote the educational trends amongst the new generation, the members of the committee visited the different villages, Khan's record reflects that the serving soldiers and junior officers of the Poonch jagir region the British-Indian Army had also financially supported his educational campaign. He did not only focus his devotion on the promotion of education amongst boys but also took a keen interest in the education of girls and established the girls-school at Cheh Chann near Pallandri on 17 November 1939.

Under this movement, various independent schools were established in the different parts of the Poonch region where teachers rendered their services on the volunteer basis. A source claimed that a gentlemen known as Sardar Shah Wali Khan had established a private school at Patola (Tain), a remote area on the North-west part of Poonch jagir in 1935 where he taught on volunteer basis until the school was taken over by State Government in its ownership in 1945. Regarding the promotion of educational, this movement lasted very positive impact on the entire region. That is why; the educational ratio in the Poonch region has remained higher than the rest of districts in Azad Kashmir. For the economic, social and infrastructural development of the region. Khan adopted a strategy to promote the working relations between the Government and society.

== History ==
Khan first entered politics with his election to the seat of Tehsil Bagh and Sudhnati in the first elections of the Jammu & Kashmir Legislative Assembly, held in 1934. His political rival, Ch. Khan Bahadar Khan Bhango, received less than 1000 votes and consequently lost his security deposit.

Khan was returned to the Tehsil Bagh and Sudhnoti seat in subsequent Legislative Assembly elections until 1946, when he stepped aside voluntarily in favour of Sardar Muhammad Ibrahim Khan, who later became the first president of Azad Kashmir.

In 1947 he became Chairman of the War Council during the Poonch Rebellion, and later became a Member of the Defence Council. He also organised 60,000 ex-servicemen from the Sudhantribe to fight against Dogra rule in Poonch.

He dedicated his life and the resources he had, to improving the lives of the Muslims of Poonch particularly and the Muslims of Kashmir generally. His main political concern was the plight of Muslims under the allegedly oppressive double tier rule of Raja Poonch and Maharaja of Kashmir. He worked against various social evils prevailing among his people at that time. He motivated his people to give up the superfluous and frivolous social practices like Dowry, lavish spending on birth, death and marriage rituals, naswar and cigarettes, he emphasized the importance of education for all. It is basically thanks to his efforts that Azad Kashmir today has a comparatively higher literacy rate then the neighbouring areas of NWFP and Punjab. He founded the Sudhan Educational Conference which still provides free education for the poor, he also set up a muthi bhar atta scheme where a handful of each family's surplus flour was collected everyday and used to fund projects such as the construction of the Jamia mosque and the Darul Allum Madrassa in Pallandri.

== Role in 1947 Rebellion ==
Shortly after the announcement of the partition plan 3 June 1947 under which the South Asian Sub-continent was divided into two sovereign states named Pakistan and India, Khan Sahib Col Khan Muhammad Khan Baba e Poonch held a meeting of ex-service men at Pallandri and announced the formation of home guards for various groups of villages in Sudhnati, Bagh and Kotli. It was the first step towards the armed rebellion for accession of Kashmir to Pakistan. Khan sb Col Khan Muhammad Khan established Numb camp near Pallandri on 1 October 1947 and made arrangements for distribution of dry rations to volunteers coming forward to join liberation forces being organized to fight against the Dogra rule. On 2 October 1947 Khan Sahib held last meeting to organize Mujahid forces in Chechan area. Many retired JCOs and ex-service men from lower Sudhnati and adjoining areas of Kotli attended the meeting. On 6 October 1947 a War Council under Khan sahib Col Khan Muhammad Khan Baba e Poonch was set up at Pallandri. It was subsequently reconstituted and renamed as Defence Council Under Lieutenant Col Syed Ali Ahmed Shah, Defence Minister as Chairman and Syed Nazeer Hussain Shah, Finance Minister, Brig Muhammad Zaman Kiyani, Col Habib ur Rehman and Sahib Khan Col Khan Muhammad Khan as members.

1st Azad Kashmir Battalion was officially raised at Kotli on 28 November by Sub Major (Shaheed Caption) Muhammad Hussain Khan. Its raising day was back dated to 6 October 1947 by Chairman War Council Khan Sahib Col Khan Muhammad Khan and the Unit moved towards Jhangar the same night.

During the tour of State Maharaja Hari Singh, the rule, arrived at Rawlakot, in the heartland of Muslim Sudhun tribe, on 21 April 1947. He was somewhat alarmed to see over 40 thousand ex-service men of British Indian Army gathered to receive him. This gathering was organized by Khan Sahib Col Khan Muhammad Khan, a respected and eminent member of warrior Sudhun tribe. On return to his Capital the Maharaja moved here Jammu and Kashmir infantry battalion (1st, 8th & 9th) to Poonch under newly raised J&K Poonch Battalion.

== Awards and honours ==
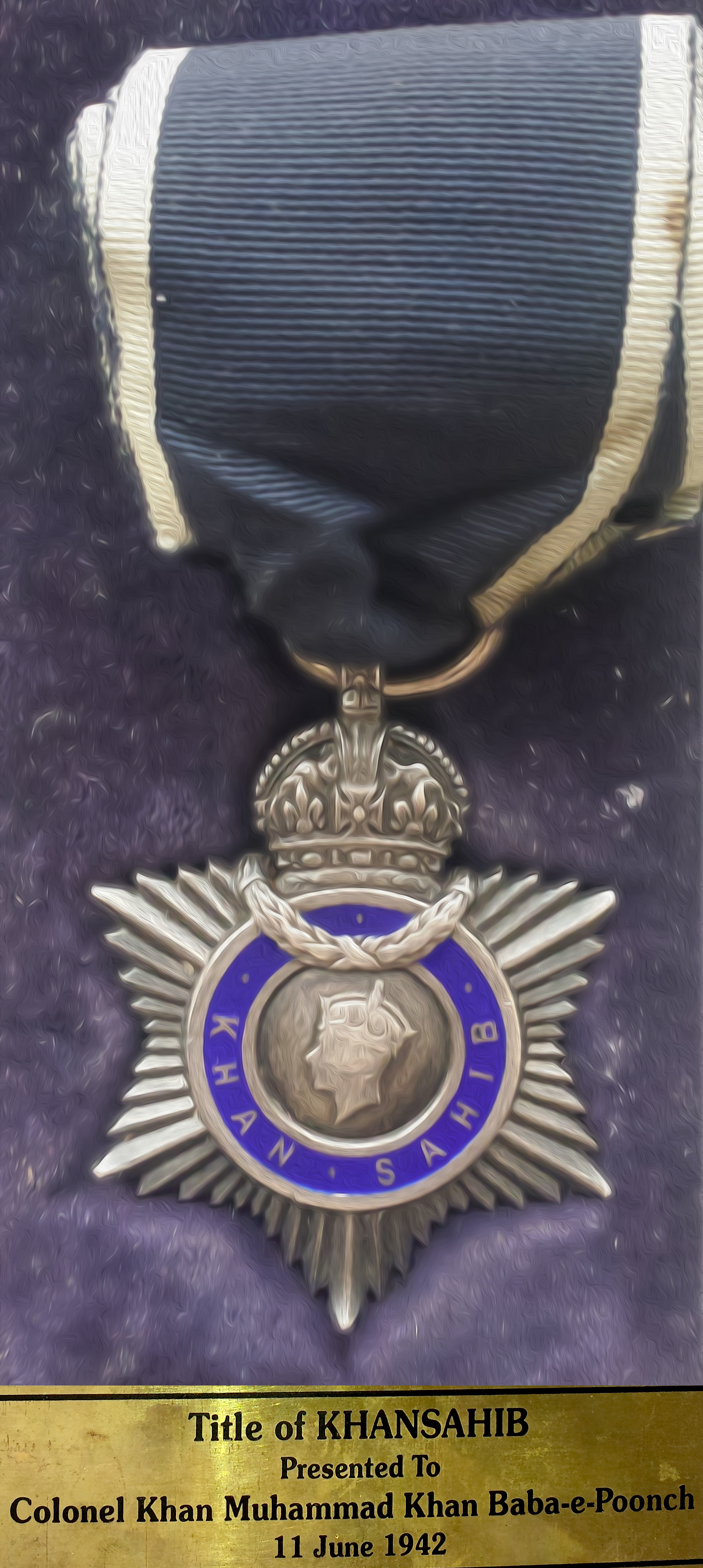
Khansab award

For his commitment and selfless service to the people of Kashmir, he was given title of Khansahib on 11 June 1942 Awarded by Viceroy & Governor-General of India on behalf of the British Government, the Azad Jammu and Kashmir Government awarded him the honorary titles of Baba-e-Poonch and Gazi-e-Kashmir.

His home town of Chechan in Sudhanoti has been renamed Khanabad in his honour, and the Khan Muhammad Khan degree college of Pallandri is named after him. Cadet College Palandri has also one House named Khan House named after him.

Every year on 11 November, the anniversary of his death in 1961, thousands of people gather and pay homage at his tomb in Pallandri. His son Col M.Naqi Khan remained Advisor to Prime Minister AJK, Member of Azad Jammu Kashmir Legislative Assembly and Minister For Health & Food in AJK Government. After Col Naqi Khan's death, his son and Khan Sahib's grandson Dr Muhammad Najeeb Naqi Khan also joined politics and has been elected five times as Member of Azad Kashmir Legislative Assembly, once remained member of Kashmir Council and is former Health & Finance Minister AJK.

== Bibliography ==
- Ankit, Rakesh (August 2010), "The Problem of Poonch", Epilogue, 4 (8): 8–49
- Saraf, Muhammad Yusuf (1977), Kashmiris Fight for Freedom, Volume 1, Ferozsons
- Suharwardy, Abdul Haq (1983), Tragedy in Kashmir, Wajidalis
- Kashmir in Muslim Era by P.N. Parmu
- Kitab Al Hind by Alberuni
