= Hurnamaira, Rawalakot =

Village in Pakistan

Hurnamaira Hurna Maira
- Village
- Location within Pakistan
- Coordinates: 33°52′13″N 73°42′2″E

Hurnamaira is a village in the tribal belt of Azad Kashmir, Pakistan. It is located five miles east of the Capital city of Poonch District, Rawalakot. It is considered to be a suburb of Rawalakot.

== Geography ==
Hurnamaira is approximately 67 kilometers (or 42 miles) from the capital of Pakistan, Islamabad.
