= 1955 Poonch uprising =

Revolt in Azad Jammu and Kashmir

| Date | February 1955 – October 1956 (1 year and 8 months) |
| Location | Azad Jammu and Kashmir |
| Result | Rebellion suppressed |

Belligerents
| Sudhans | Government of Pakistan: Government of Azad Kashmir |

Commanders and leaders
| Ibrahim Khan; Sher Ahmed Khan | Mushtaq Ahmed Gurmani; Major Usman |

Units involved
| Tribes | Punjab Constabulary; Azad Kashmir Police; Pakistan Army |

Casualties and losses
| Several arrested | 500 Pakistan Army soldiers captured (later freed) |

The 1955 Poonch uprising was a civil revolt in Azad Jammu and Kashmir against the State of Pakistan. The uprising broke out in February 1955 and was provoked largely by the dismissal of Sardar Ibrahim Khan. It took a year until the uprising was suppressed in October 1956.

== Events ==
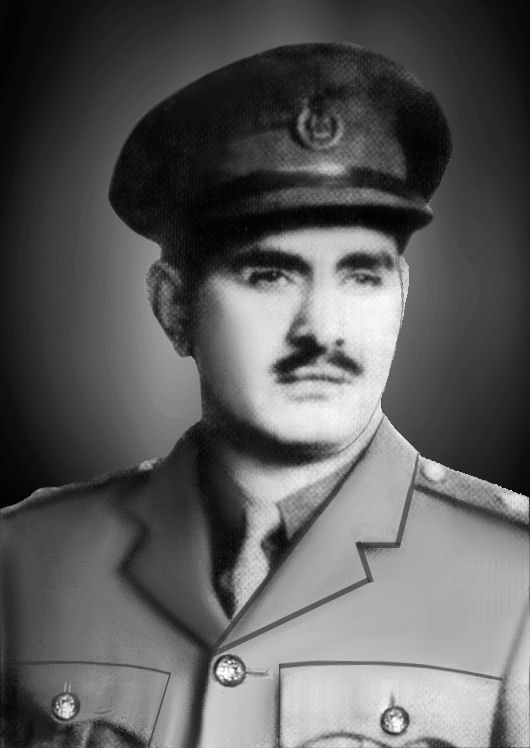
Colonel Sher Ahmed Khan, a sardar (tribal chief) of the Sudhan tribe during 1955 Poonch rebellion

A major uprising occurred around the Rawalakot and Pallandri tehsils of Poonch (then a district, now a division), against the State of Pakistan by angered Sudhans. After the 'bomb shell' of Sardar Ibrahim Khan's dismissal, who was a respected leader of the Sudhan tribe, 'Colonel (Retired) Sher Ahmed Khan, another sardar and scion of the Sudhan tribe and the senior most military officer from Poonch, was made a cabinet minister with responsibility for defense, education and health. Colonel Sher Ahmed Khan eventually resigned because his tribe was strongly opposed to his replacement of Sardar Ibrahim Khan; violent demonstrations had occurred particularly in the tribals strongholds of Rawalakot and Pallandri, where tribals displeased with the dismissal of Ibrahim Khan protested the replacement government.

The turmoil in Poonch continued to worsen until the Azad Kashmir Police could no longer control it, resulting in members of the Punjab Constabulary of the Pakistani Army being brought in. The Pakistan Army's 12th Division, with headquarters in Murree and with some forces already deployed in Azad Kashmir joined in to suppress the unrest, declaring martial law in Poonch and beginning the PC Pak Search Sudhan Operation. In the ensuing conflict, some Sudhan tribals captured 150 soldiers of the Punjab Constabulary and obtained their weapons. Sudhan antigovernment actions intensified in February 1955 with an assassination attempt in Poonch on the Azad Kashmir President, Sher Ahmed Khan, from which he had a 'miraculous escape'. Matters escalated when police sought to arrest an 'absconding accused' by entering a mosque at Pallandri. Thereafter, Sudhans clashed with the Pakistan Army, and the Punjab Constabulary, which dealt with the insurrection brutally. Similarly, the Punjab Prosecuting Agency was 'a terror' to Azad Kashmiris, particularly those incarcerated. It took another year until the uprising was suppressed in 1956.

== Causes ==
A major cause of the rebellion was the demand of the local people for autonomy in administrative and budgetary affairs.

A resistance movement seeking a more democratic state of Azad Kashmir had been active since September 1950. In 1951 a parallel government was formed in Poonch in retaliation for Pakistan's dismissal of Sardar Ibrahim Khan as head of state. The situation calmed down for some time because of Liaquat Ali Khan's assassination.

When Sardar Ibrahim protested, his government was dismissed. A revolt erupted in Rawalakot and Palandri in the Poonch district as a reaction to this action by the Pakistani State. A military contingent of 120 personnel led by Major Usman was sent in to crush the revolt and arrest its leaders. After an initial skirmish Ibrahim's forces were defeated and his tribe disarmed under the guidance of Pakistan's then Minister of Kashmir Affairs, Mushtaq Ahmed Gurmani, and the weapons were handed over to the government of Pakistan.

General elections were held in 1952. Sher Ahmed Khan, a Sudhan, took office as the President of Azad Kashmir. Sardar Abdul Qayyum was also part of the cabinet. However, after the passing of the Azad Kashmir Rules of Business in October 1952, all executive power was vested in the Joint Secretary of the Ministry of Kashmir Affairs (Pakistan).

== Aftermath ==
Sardar Abdul Qayyum would later write that, "In 1955 when police were brought in from the Punjab, what they did here is a black stain on our history... When in 1956 I became the president I got a chance to reduce their grievances. Hence a number of people who were in prison and suffering distress were released.... but those whose homes were burnt out were not compensated. Although to reduce their sorrows in sympathy, I gave them bits of money."

On the Ministry of Kashmir Affairs, Sardar Ibrahim Khan exclaimed, "The Ministry played havoc with the Azad Kashmir movement and had it finally liquidated to the satisfaction of all bureaucrats in Pakistan." On democracy in AJK, he also stated, "It is like hell. It is the worst example of democracy.... It has not served Kashmiris at all. It has always divided [them] and made them fight amongst themselves."

The uprising had led to a number of strict and draconian security laws being passed by the local government and Ministry of Kashmir Affairs, including the 'Azad Kashmir Public Safety Act 1953', 'The Pallandhri Disturbances Special Tribunal Act 1955 and 1956', 'The Control of Goondas Act 1956', as well as 'The Azad Kashmir Recovery of Abducted Persons Act 1953 and 1956'.

== See also ==
- 1947 Poonch Rebellion
- Poonch district, Pakistan
- History of Poonch District
- Azad Kashmir
- History of Azad Kashmir
