= Mang, Azad Kashmir =

Village in Azad Kashmir

Mang منگ Mong
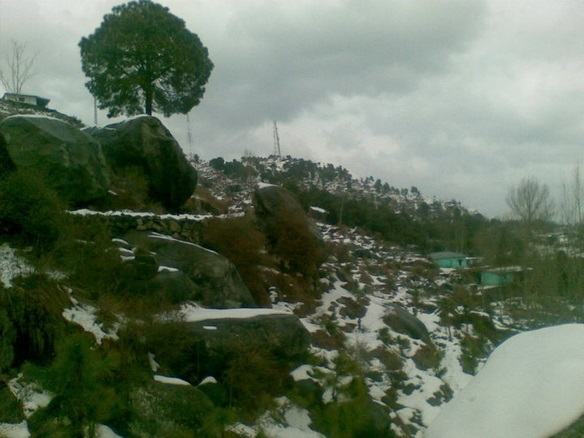

- Location within Azad Kashmir Location within Pakistan
- Coordinates: 33.797301°N 73.635772°E
- Country: Kashmir
- Territory: Azad Kashmir
- District: Sudhnoti District

Area
  - Total: 1,010 km^{2} (390 sq mi)
- Elevation: 1,400 m (4,500 ft)

Population (2017)
  - Total: 297,584 (Sudhnoti District population including the village Mong Azad Kashmir)
  - Density: 375/km^{2} (970/sq mi)
- Time zone: UTC+5 (PST)
- Calling code: 05827
- Number of Villages: 7
- Number of Union councils: 3, (Mong, Patan Shar Khan, and Dhingroon Kanchri)

Mang (also spelt Mong) is a town in Sudhanoti District of Azad Kashmir, Pakistan.

== Geography ==
Mong consists of 7 villages and 2 union councils: Mong and Patan Sher Khan.

Mong is well connected by roads to major cities of Kashmir and Pakistan. Mong is connected to Pallandri, Rawalakot, Thorar. Daily buses carry passengers inter-state as well as within the city. The nearest major airport is located at Rawalakot which isn't operational so nearest is Islamabad International Airport.

== History ==
Mong is a stronghold of the Sudhan tribe, and served important roles as a fortress in the 1837 Poonch Revolt and as a base of operations in the 1947 Poonch Revolt.

In the 1837 Poonch Revolt, the Sudhans resisted Gulab Singh and Sikh forces from the fortress of Mong, where a deadly battle was fought until its capture by a prolonged assault.

== Education ==
Mong has several schools and a campus of the University of Poonch.

== Notable people ==
- Khan of Mong Captain Khan Muhammad Khan, guerrilla leader in the First Kashmir War.
