= Pachiot =

Village in Azad Kashmir

Pachiot also known as Chirroti Pachiot, is a large village in the suburbs of Rawalakot city, Azad Kashmir, Pakistan. It is home to the largest union council in Azad Kashmir, which connects many of the local union councils.

== Origins ==
Pachiot was the name of a local group of five villages, which later became the name of the large area between Goi Nala and Nala Mahall, until a village by the same name was founded in 1947.

== Union council ==
Pachiot's union council comprises many local villages including Datote, Jovarabad, Paniola, Bagiana, Chiroti, Barain, Ballari, Khairian, Lagiryat, Numbl, Sumlary, Baglay Sangal Khater, Sair Gohra, Argali, Topi, Bari Danna, Baroota, and many other small villages.

== Notable people ==
- Sardar Sayab Khalid, Former Speaker and former MLA in the AJK Assembly.
