= Sher Ahmed Khan =

Colonel Sher Ahmed Khan Sher-e-Jang
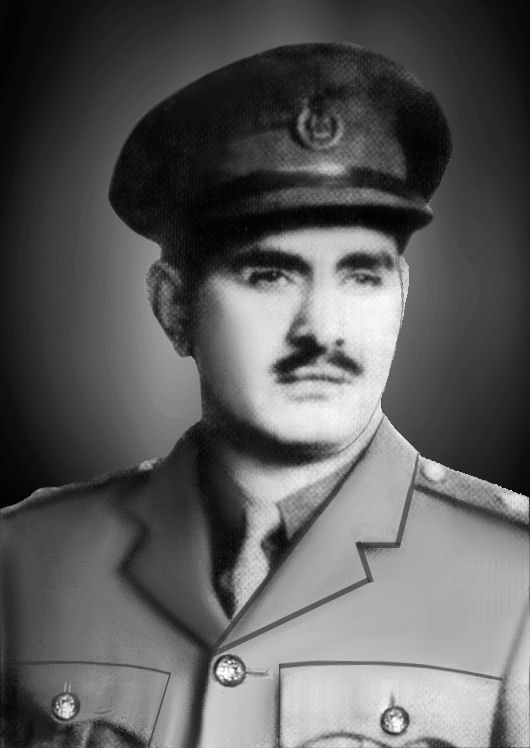
- Colonel Sardar Sher Ahmed Khan in his Army Uniform.

President of Azad Jammu and Kashmir
- In office 22 June 1952 – 30 May 1956
- Preceded by: Raja Muhammad Haydar Khan (interim)
- Succeeded by: Mirwaiz Yusuf Shah

Personal details
- Born: 1902 Pallandri, Poonch District (now Sudhnuti District), Jammu and Kashmir, British India
- Died: 23 January 1972 (aged 69–70) Rawalpindi, Pakistan
- Party: Military

Colonel Sher Ahmed Khan (1902 at Pallandri, Poonch, Jammu and Kashmir – 1972) (Now in Sudhnuti, Azad Kashmir), was one of the Sudhan guerrilla commanders of the Azad Army and also served as the President of Azad Kashmir. He was known as Sher-e-Jang (The Lion of the War) and awarded the Fakhr-i-Kashmir (Pride of Kashmir), which is equivalent to Hilal-i-Jurat.

== Sudhan's uprising against the State of Pakistan ==
A major uprising occurred around the Rawalakot and Pallandri tehsils of Poonch against the State of Pakistan; amongst displeased Sudhans, which Ibrahim claimed lasted for seventeen months. After the ‘bomb shell’ of Ibrahim's dismissal, ‘Colonel (Retired) Sher Ahmed Khan, a sardar and scion of the Sudhan tribe and the senior most military officer from Poonch, was made a cabinet minister with responsibility for defence, education and health. Colonel Sher Ahmed Khan tellingly resigned because ‘his community, the Sudhans, were strongly opposed to his appointment in view of the practical dismissal of their Chief, Sardar Ibrahim Khan, violent demonstrations had occurred particularly in the Rawalakot and Pallandri areas of Poonch, where Sudhans displeased with the sacking of their ‘man’, Ibrahim, opposed the replacement government. There also had been a showdown between the Sudhans and the Pakistan Army contingents posted in the area’, which ‘caused great concern to the Central Government’. The Poonch situation became so bad that the Azad Kashmir Police could not control it. Members of the Punjab Constabulary of Pakistani Army were brought in. The Pakistan Army's 12th Division, with headquarters in Murree and with forces already deployed in Azad Kashmir, joined in the suppression, declaring martial law in Poonch. The fighting was not one-sided. Some Sudhans had captured 120 soldiers of the Punjab Constabulary, and their arms. Sudhan's anti government actions started in February 1955 with an assassination attempt in Poonch on the Azad Kashmir President, Sher Ahmed Khan, from which he had a ‘miraculous escape’. Matters escalated when the police sought to arrest an ‘absconding accused’ by entering a mosque at Pallandri. Thereafter, Sudhans clashed with the Pakistan Army and the Punjab Constabulary, which dealt with the insurrection brutally. Similarly, the Punjab Prosecuting Agency was ‘a terror’ to Azad Kashmiris, particularly those incarcerated. It took 1 year until the uprising was suppressed in 1956.
