= Jhangar =

Jhangar Jhanger
- Village
- Interactive map of Jhangar
- Location in Jammu and Kashmir, India Jhangar (India)
- Coordinates: 33.238446°N 74.053341°E
- Country: India
- Union territory: Jammu and Kashmir
- District: Rajouri
- Time zone: UTC+5:30 (IST)

Jhangar or Jhanger is a village in the Rajouri district of Indian-administered Jammu and Kashmir, close to the Line of Control that divides the Indian and Pakistan-administered portions of Kashmir.

== History ==
Prior to 1947, Jhangar was the base of the Mirpur–Poonch Brigade of the State Forces of the princely state of Jammu and Kashmir. It was at a strategic location that was roughly equidistant from the towns of Bhimber, Mirpur, Kotli and Rajouri. It was fiercely contested between the Indian and Pakistani forces during the Indo-Pakistani War of 1947–1948, eventually coming under Indian control. The village faces frequent shelling from Pakistan.

== Bibliography ==
- Dasgupta, C. (2014) [first published 2002], War and Diplomacy in Kashmir, 1947-48, SAGE Publications, ISBN 978-81-321-1795-7
- Singh, K. Brahma (1990), History of Jammu and Kashmir Rifles, 1820-1956: The State Force Background, Lancer International, ISBN 978-81-7062-091-4
  - Singh, K. Brahma (2010) [first published Lancer International 1990], History of Jammu and Kashmir Rifles, 1820-1956: The State Force Background (PDF), brahmasingh.co.nf, ISBN 978-81-7062-091-4, archived from the original (PDF) on 6 March 2016
- Palit, D. K. (1972), Jammu and Kashmir Arms: History of the J & K Rifles, Palit & Dutt
- Raghavan, Srinath (2010), War and Peace in Modern India, Palgrave Macmillan, ISBN 978-1-137-00737-7
