= Rawalakot Tehsil =

Tehsil in Azad Kashmir, Pakistan

Rawalakot راولا کوٹ
- Town
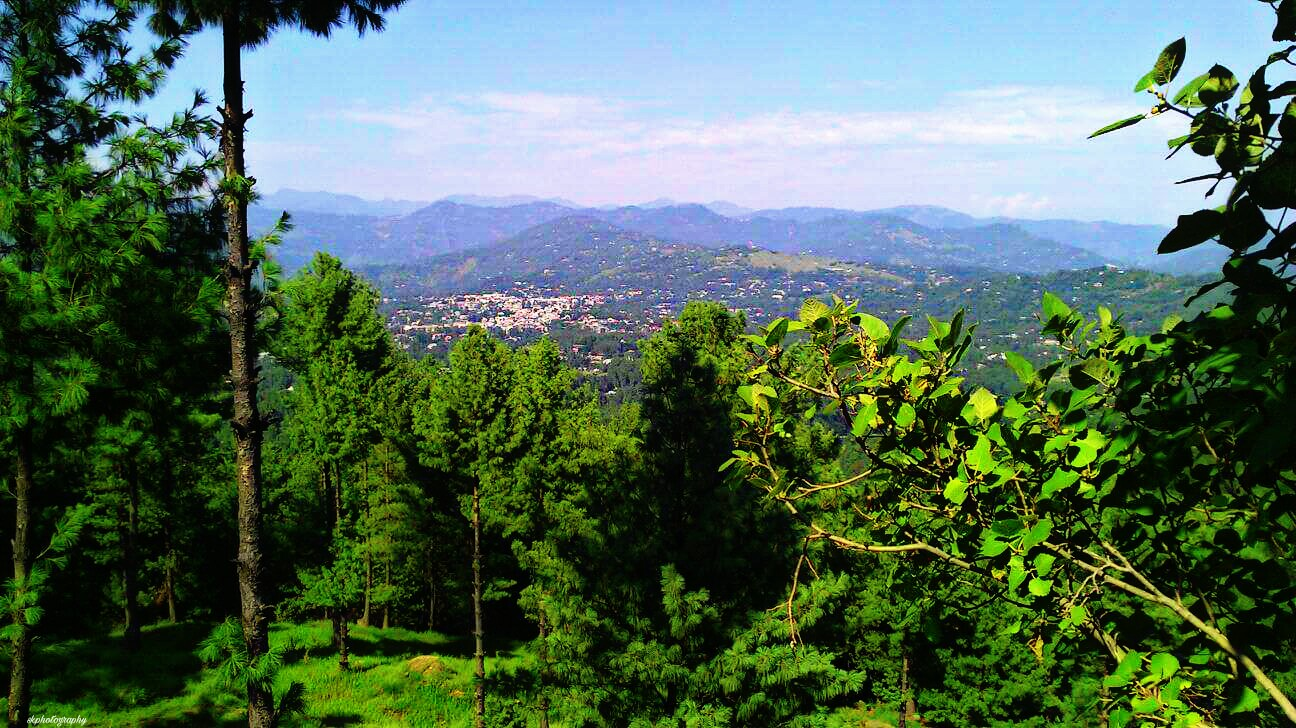
- A view of Rawalakot
- Etymology: "Pearl river" in Urdu
- Location of Rawalakot Rawalakot (Kashmir) Rawalakot (Pakistan)
- Coordinates: 33°51′12″N 73°45′05″E
- Administering country: Pakistan
- District: Poonch District
- Elevation: 1,638 m (5,374 ft)

Population (2017)
  - Total: 56,006
  - Estimate (2018): 56,590
  - Density: 375/km^{2} (970/sq mi)

Languages
  - Official: Urdu (Note: Snedden (2013, p. 176): On p. 29, the census report states that Urdu is the official language of the government of Azad Kashmir, with Kashmiri, Pahari, Gojri, Punjabi, Kohistani, Pushto, and Sheena 'frequently spoken in Azad Kashmir'. Yet, when surveyed about their 'mother tongue', Azad Kashmiris' choices were limited to selecting from Pakistan's major languages: Urdu, Punjabi, Sindhi, Pushto, Balochi, Saraiki, and 'others'; not surprisingly, 2.18 million of Azad Kashmir's 2.97 million people chose 'others'.)
  - Spoken: Pahari, Gujari, Hindko
- Time zone: UTC+5 (PST)
- 05824: 0092
- Number of towns: 3
- Number of Union councils: 21

Rawalakot (Urdu: راولا کوٹ) is a tehsil, valley and the capital of the Poonch district in Pakistan–administered Azad Kashmir, in the disputed Kashmir region. It is located in the Pir Panjal Range. Rawalakot is also known as Pearl Valley. Distance between Rawalakot and Islamabad city is 120 Km.

== History ==
=== 1955 Poonch uprising ===
Along with Pallandri, Rawalakot was the focal point of the 1955 Poonch uprising. It was led by the local Sudhans, who disapproved of Sher Ahmed Khan and wanted Sardar Ibrahim Khan, as well as democratic reforms.

=== 2005 Kashmir earthquake ===
On Saturday, 8 October 2005, a 7.6 magnitude earthquake killed 73,338 people and left up to three million homeless in Pakistan, including Azad Kashmir. The city of Rawalakot suffered significant damage from the 2005 earthquake; although most of the buildings were left standing, many of them were rendered uninhabitable, and some of the population was left homeless. Most of the buildings have been reconstructed.

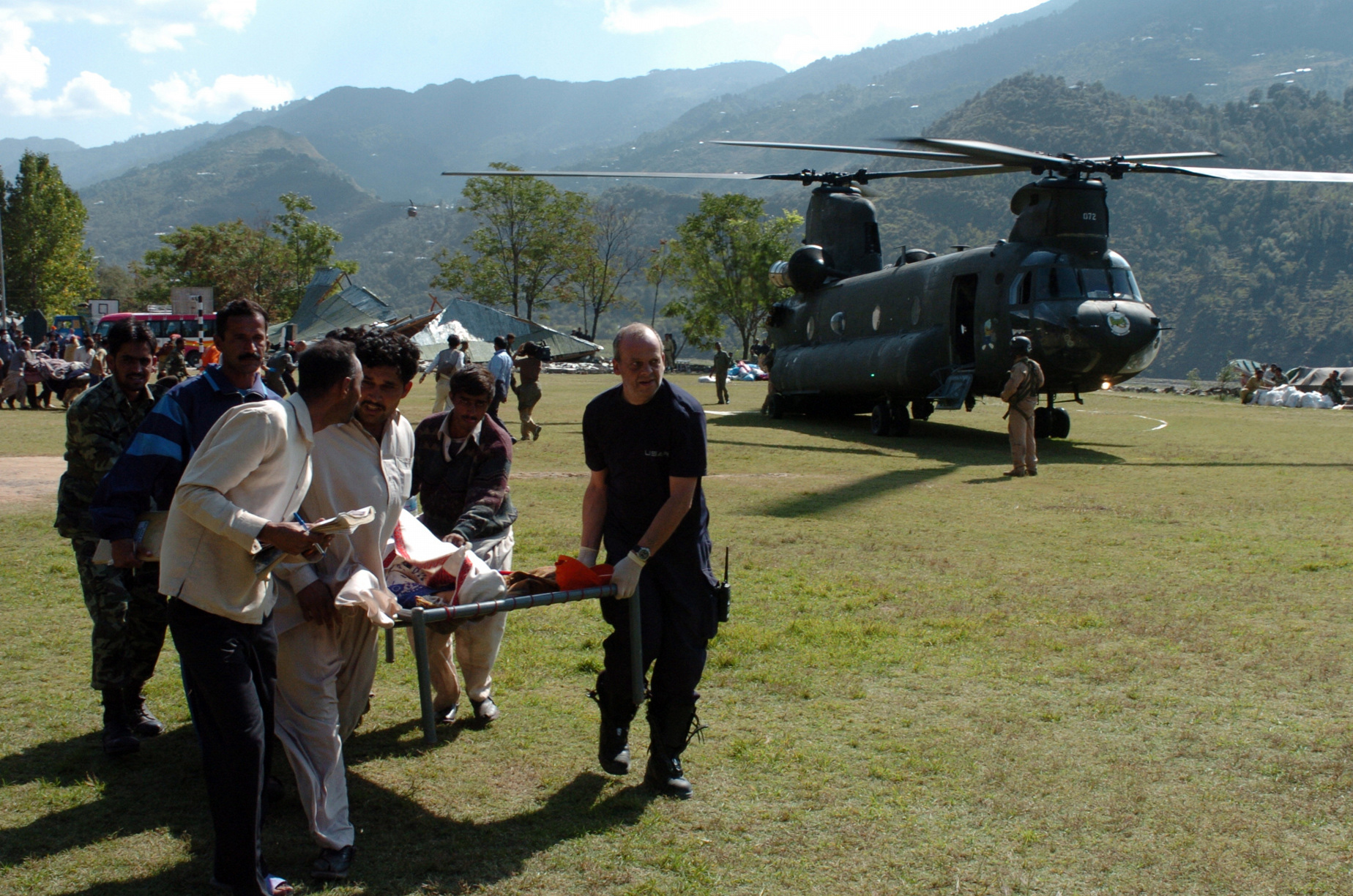
An injured civilian being carried to a U.S Army helicopter for medical evacuation in Rawalakot

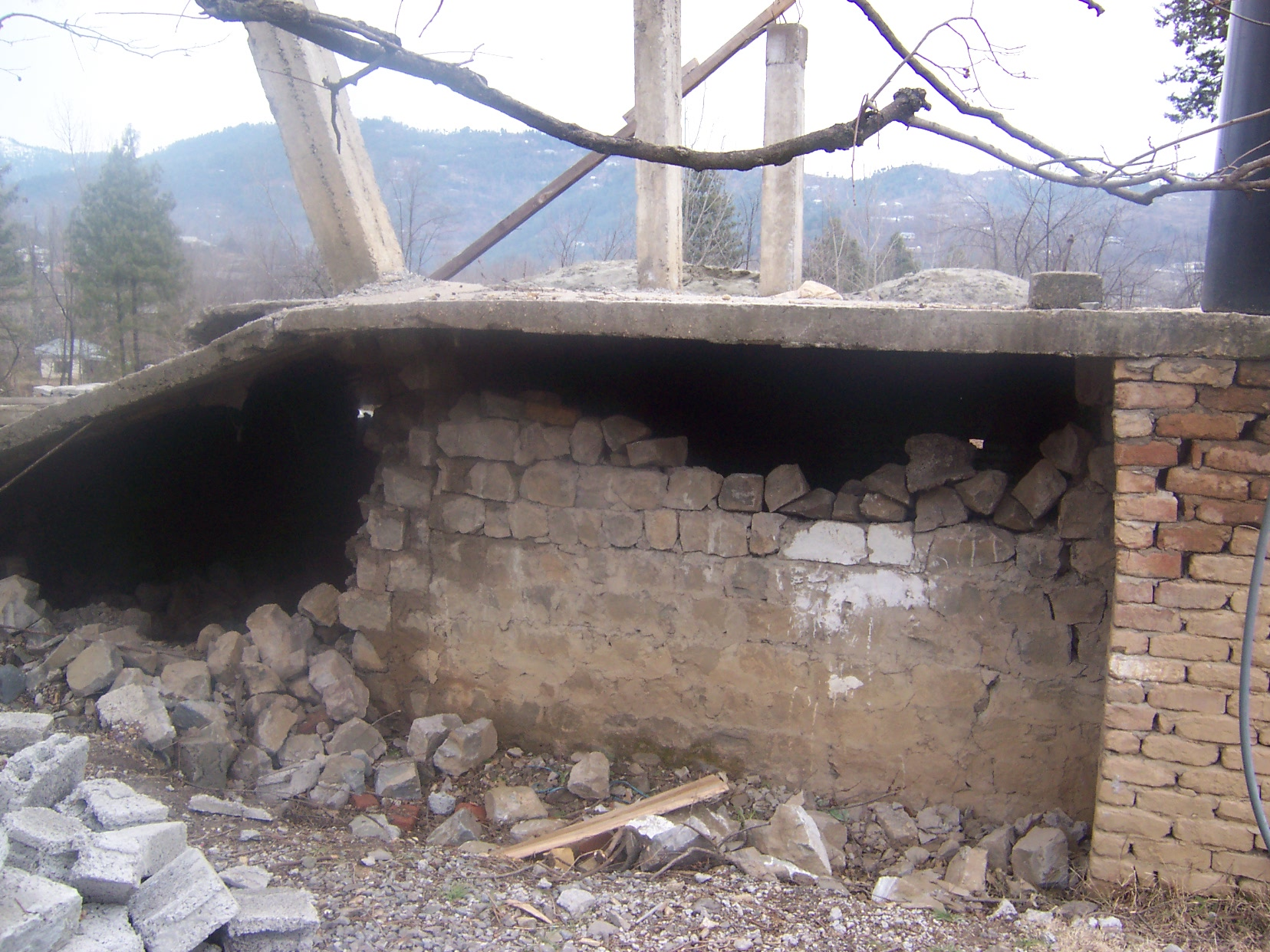
2005 earthquake damage at a home in Rawalakot

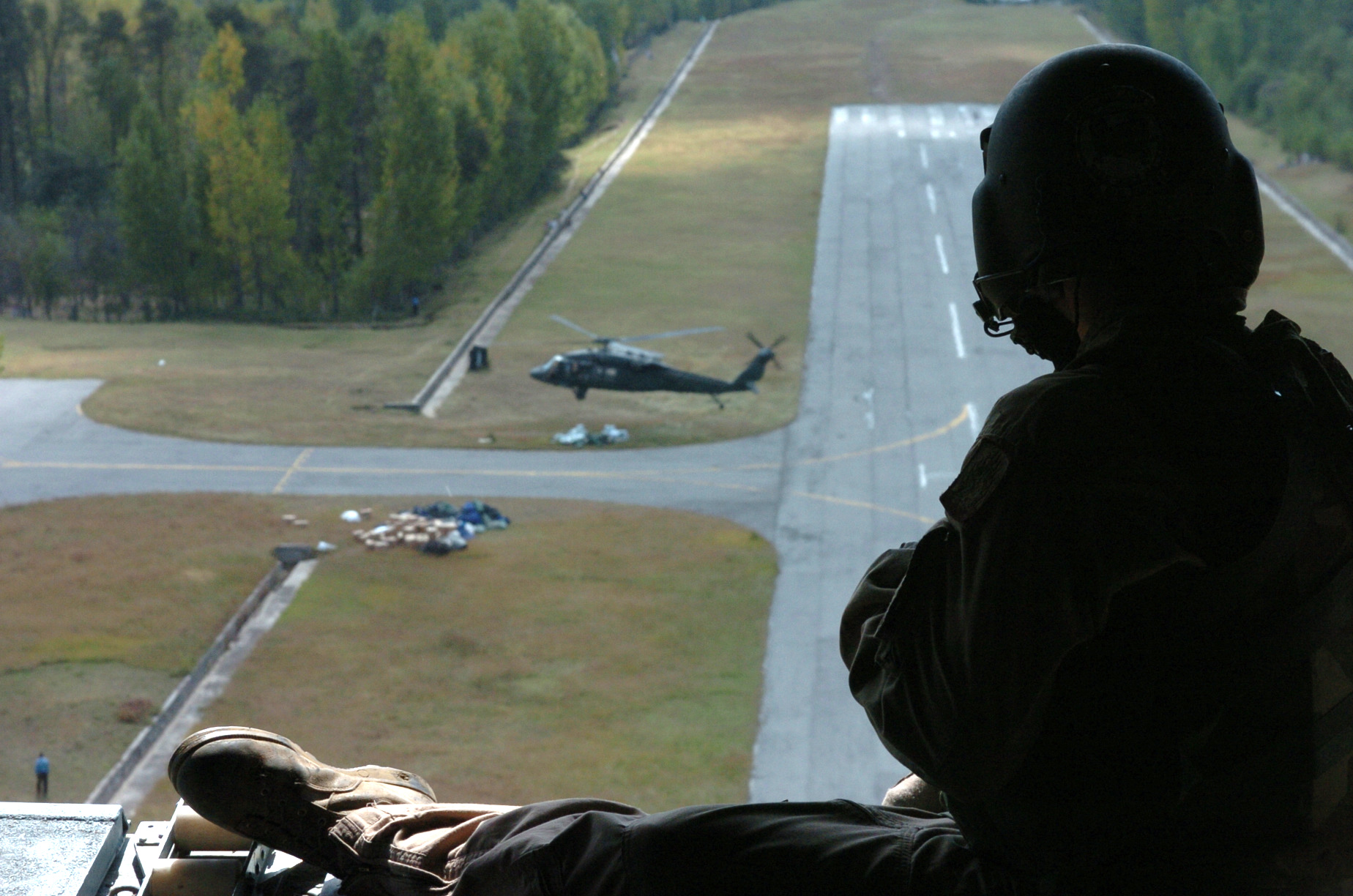
U.S Army aircraft delivering emergency aid at Rawalakot Airport after the earthquake

== Demographics ==
=== Population ===
Rawalakot has an urban population of 56,006 people according to the 2017 census, which rose to 56,590 in 2018.

=== Social groups ===
Gujjar is a major ethnic group in Rawalakot. Other ethnic groups found in the district are Bakarwals, Kashmiris, Sayeds, Rajputs, and Sudhans.

=== Languages ===
Pahari, Gujari and Hindko are the man spoken languages in Rawalakot city. Gujari is spoken by the Gujjars. Some also speak Kashmiri and Punjabi languages. Pahari (Rawalakoti) is spoken in Rawalakot city but in the rest of the Poonch district Pahari (Poonchi) is spoken. The Urdu is the official language in the area.

== Towns ==
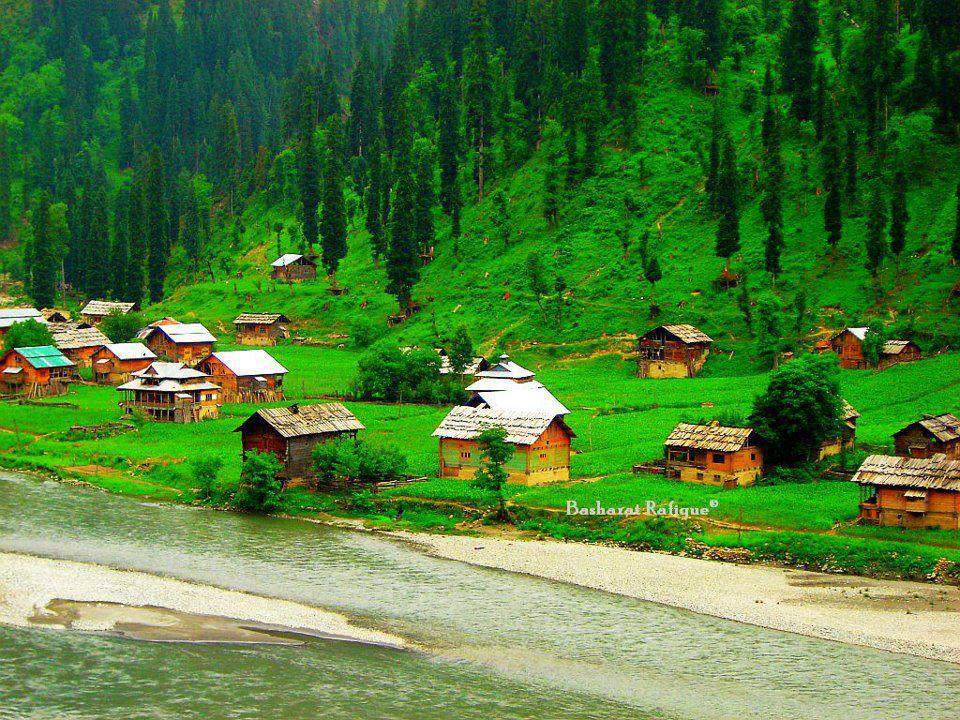
Banjosa lake in Rawalakot

- Androat
- Khai Gala, Rawalakot
- Banjosa Lake, Rawalakot
- Jandali, Rawalakot
- Dhamni, Rawalakot
- Hurnamaira, Rawalakot
- Ali Sojal, Rawalakot
- Barmang, Rawalakot
- Chak, Rawalakot
- Shaheed Gala, Rawalakot
- Pachiot, Rawalakot
- Shaheed Gala, Rawalakot
- Rehra village

== Location and transport ==
=== Location ===
Rawalakot is located at Latitude 33°51'32.18"N, Longitude 73° 45'34.93"E, with an elevation of 5374 feet. Rawalakot is approximately 76 kilometres (47 mi) from Kahuta and about 120 km (75 mi) from the city of Rawalpindi, Pakistan. It is linked to Rawalpindi and Islamabad via Goyain Nala and Tain, roads as well as Kotli Satiyan and Additionally, it is also linked with Rawalpindi via Sudhnuti.

=== Transport ===
==== Travel routes ====
Construction of the Ghazi-e-Millat road (also known as Guoien Nala road) between Rawalakot and Azad Pattan has considerably reduced travel time. It is the main road connecting Islamabad/Rawalpindi to Rawalakot city.

==== Road links ====
The road passing through Pakgali-Paniola connects Rawalakot to Bagh, Rawalpindi, and Muzaffarabad. The alternative road that passes through Mohri Farman Shah and Shuja Abad is the shortest possible road link connecting Rawalakot city with Bagh. Murree, Islamabad, and Rawalpindi are situated in a southward direction from Rawalakot. The town has another road link with Kotli.

=== Airport ===
Rawalakot Airport is non-operational and has been closed since October 2005.

== Climate ==
Rawalakot features a subtropical highland climate under the Köppen climate classification due to its high altitude. The weather of Rawalakot is quite erratic. However, the climate can be divided into four seasons: namely spring, summer, autumn, and winter. Rawalakot experiences mild to warm temperatures during the spring and autumn, humid temperatures during summer, and cold to snowy during the winter. The temperature can rise as high as 38 °C (100 °F) during the mid-summer months and drop below −1 °C (30 °F) during the winter months. Snowfall occurs in December and January, while most rainfall occurs during the monsoon season, stretching from July to September.

Climate data for Rawalakot, Azad Kashmir
Month	Jan	Feb	Mar	Apr	May	Jun	Jul	Aug	Sep	Oct	Nov	Dec	Year
Record high °C (°F)	25.6 (78.1)	32.9 (91.2)	34.4 (93.9)	41.0 (105.8)	45.0 (113.0)	46.6 (115.9)	43.2 (109.8)	40.0 (104.0)	39.4 (102.9)	39.9 (103.8)	33.3 (91.9)	28.9 (84.0)	46.6 (115.9)
Mean daily maximum °C (°F)	17.3 (63.1)	19.8 (67.6)	24.7 (76.5)	30.6 (87.1)	36.3 (97.3)	38.1 (100.6)	34.8 (94.6)	33.5 (92.3)	33.2 (91.8)	30.4 (86.7)	25.2 (77.4)	19.7 (67.5)	28.6 (83.5)
Mean daily minimum °C (°F)	3.8 (38.8)	6.7 (44.1)	11.1 (52.0)	15.9 (60.6)	21.0 (69.8)	23.8 (74.8)	24.3 (75.7)	23.6 (74.5)	21.1 (70.0)	14.8 (58.6)	8.8 (47.8)	5.0 (41.0)	15.0 (59.0)
Record low °C (°F)	−2.6 (27.3)	0.0 (32.0)	2.8 (37.0)	3.3 (37.9)	10.0 (50.0)	13.0 (55.4)	12.0 (53.6)	12.7 (54.9)	13.0 (55.4)	1.9 (35.4)	0.0 (32.0)	−3.3 (26.1)	−3.3 (26.1)
Average rainfall mm (inches)	24.9 (0.98)	30.8 (1.21)	31.2 (1.23)	20.1 (0.79)	14.4 (0.57)	44.1 (1.74)	112.8 (4.44)	136.3 (5.37)	43.8 (1.72)	15.7 (0.62)	14.5 (0.57)	19.1 (0.75)	507.7 (19.99)

== Education ==
In 2013, SOS primary School was constructed. Since 2015, the school has been operational, and almost 172 student study at this school.

Rawalakot city has almost 25 high schools, 5 degree colleges, 1 medical college, 1 University and 8 inter colleges.

== Tourism ==
Some main tourist places in Rawalakot are:

- Banjosa lake
- Thorar
- Abaspur
- Singola
- Hajira
- Devi Gali
- Khai Gala
- Ali Sojal
- Horna Maira
- Toli peer
- Datote
