= Pallandri Tehsil =

Tehsil in Azad Kashmir, Pakistan

Pallandri پلندری
- Tehsil
- Location within Azad Kashmir Location within Pakistan
- Coordinates: 33.71534°N 73.6861°E
- Administering country: Pakistan
- Territory: Azad Kashmir
- Division: Poonch
- District: Sudhanoti

Area
  - Total: 256 km^{2} (99 sq mi)

Population (2017)
  - Total: 124,179
  - Density: 485/km^{2} (1,260/sq mi)
- Time zone: UTC+5 (PKT)

Pallandri (Urdu: پلندری), also spelled Palandri and formerly Pulandari, is a tehsil and the administrative capital of Sudhanoti District in Azad Kashmir, a part of Kashmir administered by Pakistan. It was the initial proposed capital of Azad Kashmir and the epicentre of the 1955 Poonch uprising led by the Sudhan tribe.

== History ==
On 21 October 1947, a day before the outbreak of the India–Pakistan war of 1947–1948, an Indian journalist in Lahore, Pakistan, named Shri GK Reddy mistakenly received a trunk call from Lieutant Colonel Alavi, then the public relations officer of the Pakistan Army. Alavi believed he was speaking to a Muslim official and informed Reddy that preparations were underway to form Azad Kashmir with Pallandri as its capital. Reddy immediately fled from Lahore to Bombay (present-day Mumbai) in India and his story was reported in the weekly newspaper Blitz on 9 June 1948.

Pallandri was central to the 1955 Poonch uprising by the local Sudhan populace, which presented demands for greater autonomy. The rebellion was incited by the removal of the Sudhan leader Sardar Ibrahim Khan, and the attempted assassination of Sher Ahmed Khan in February 1955 marked the beginning of the uprising-proper.

== Administration and geography ==
Pallandri is one of four tehsils (subdistricts) belonging to Sudhanoti District in Azad Kashmir, a part of Kashmir administered by Pakistan. The other three are Baloch, Mong, and Tarar Khel. The headquarters of the district government of Sudhanoti are located in Pallandri. Pallandri was part of Poonch District until Sudhanoti District was created from it following the creation of Azad Kashmir.

The tehsil spans an area of 256 square kilometres and is located some 94 kilometres away from the national capital Islamabad. There are 27 villages under the jurisdiction of Pallandri.

== Demographics ==
The 2017 Pakistani census recorded 124,179 people living in 19,587 households in Pallandri.

== Education ==
Cadet College Palandri AJK, a government-run boy's military academy, is located in Pallandri.

== Notable people ==
- Khan Muhammad Khan (1882–1961), Sudhan leader
