= Sudhan =

Tribe in the Poonch region of Azad Kashmir

سُدھن

Total population
- Around 500,000 (2006 estimations)

Regions with significant populations
- Poonch, Sudhanoti, Bagh, Kotli

Languages
- Pahari (Poonchi)

Religion
- Islam

Sudhan are a tribe of the Poonch Division of the Pakistan-administered Azad Kashmir region, with their population primarily concentrated in the districts of Poonch and Sudhanoti, and smaller populations in the neighbouring areas of Bagh and Kotli. According to oral traditions, the Sudhans allegedly originated from Pashtun areas, and are regarded as the founding tribe of the Sudhanoti region, which bears their name.

== History and origins ==
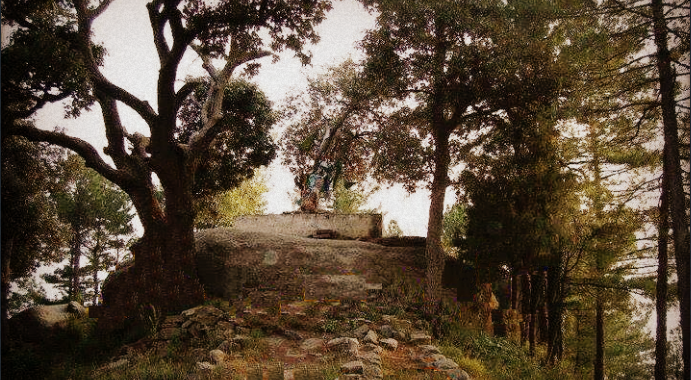
The palace of Nawab Jassi Khan, on the Jassa Pir mountain in Mang town in Sudhanoti district of Azad Kashmir

The tribe claims an Afghan ancestry. Alastair Lamb, a British historian and ethnographer wrote that there is a significant Pathan influence in Poonch and that the Sudhans, a major group claim to be of Afghan descent. According to Syed Ali, Sudhans have a Pashtun descent and moved to the Poonch district of Kashmir region some centuries ago. Sardar Ibrahim Khan, the first president of Azad Kashmir and himself a Sudhan wrote that Sudhans belong to the Sudhazai tribe of Pashtuns and migrated from Afghanistan via Dera Ismail Khan. Sudhans consider themselves to be Sudhozai or Saddozai Pathans (Pashtuns). Their claim to a Pashtun heritage is considered to be alleged. Scholar Iffat Malik of the Institute of Strategic Studies Islamabad writes:

The Sudhans claim their origin from Afghanistan and they consider themselves to be descendants of a common ancestor Jassi Khan, who was an Afghan chief and had earned the name of Sudhan (from Sanskrit, meanings "justice, fair and honest") as a compliment to his valour as he 500 years or so ago landed in Western parts of Poonch and fought for their existence, but the local people dominated them in this period, they multiplied quickly and emerged into a strong and powerful tribe. According to them, they are same as the Sudhazai tribe of high class Afghans. In social habits and customs they also are certainly akin to Sudhazais of Afghanistan. Among Afghans, Sudhazai are a very respected clan with long good history behind them. Sikhs and Dogras had to fight the Sudhans in wars spread over a fairly long time as they had never been reconciled to their rule by them, and there was first rebellion in 1837, after Sudhan people went in revolt against Sikh Empire, had captured hills from Sikhs, however Sudhans were defeated by Sikhs but survived as a strong tribe. In 1947, Sudhans were first to challenge Dogras.

The Sudhan population was recorded to be 56,754 in the 1911 census, with 28,160 males and 28,594 females.

=== Alleged origins and history ===
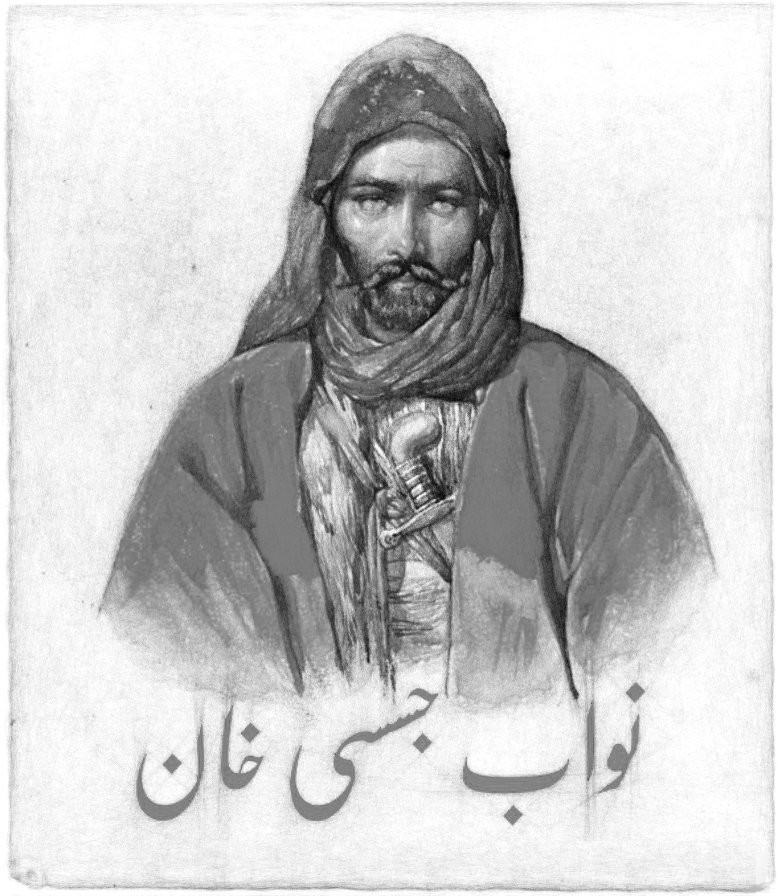
Depiction of Nawab Jassi Khan

Although no contemporary sources exist that verify the Sudhan alleged origins, the Sudhan oral tradition and writings generally state that in the late 14th and early 15th centuries, a Pashtun chieftain named Jassi Khan, a descendant of his ancestor Saddo and hailing from Ghazni encamped in the Murree hills with his small Pashtun force, neighbouring west to the areas of the modern day Sudhanoti and Poonch districts. It is stated that the territories had originally been inhabited by local Brahmins, who had recently faced an invasion by a Rajput tribe called the Bagars (or Bhagris). The Bagars are said to have subjugated and oppressively ruled over the Brahmins, who sought the assistance of Jassi in expelling the Bagar occupiers. Jassi is said to have travelled to Pashtun territories, increasing the size of his forces, and taking command of both his and the rebelling Brahmin army and then overwhelming and expelling the Bagars from the region. It is said that afterwards Jassi took rule over the region and settled the Pashtuns from his forces. He was accepted by the Brahmins as a ruler, who granted him and the Pashtuns the laqab (title) "Sudhan" from Sanskrit, which is said to have been given as a compliment to their valor. It is said that Jassi and the Pashtuns accepted the title, and that Jassi renamed the captured territories to "Sudhanoti". His descendants and the Sudhans are said to have continued autonomous rule in Sudhanoti until their 1837 Poonch Revolt against the Sikh Empire and Dogra dynasty. After the failure of the rebellion, the Sudhans were stripped of autonomy and fully integrated into the Sikh Empire and brought under the control of the Lahore government.

According to books written throughout the 20th and 21st centuries, such as "The Pearl String of Saddozais" by Sabir Hussain Sabir, Jassi Khan belongs to the lineage of a different Sadullah Khan than the Malik Saddu Khan of the Saddozai branch of the Durrani Confederation. This Saddullah is said to have been born in 961 AD, and was the son of Atman, whom himself was a descendant of one Uthman. This gives way to an "Uthmanzai" branch of a different Saddozai tribe. The Saddozai are a lineage of the Popalzai clan of the Abdali tribe of the ethnic Pashtun. The lineage takes its name from its ancestor, Saddo Khan.

=== Contributions to British Army ===
The Sudhan tribe contributed significant numbers of recruits into the British Indian Army during World War 1 and World War II. Their total contribution to the British Indian Army during World War I and World War II is considered to be between 40,000 and 60,000 soldiers.

== 1819–1832 resistance against Sikh conquest ==
In 1819, under the leadership of Ranjit Singh, the Sikhs had successfully routed the Saddozai Kingdom from Kashmir. Subsequently, the Sikh Empire came to rule the region of the Kashmir Valley, though they had previously already obtained control over Jammu.

The regions of Poonch and Muzaffarabad had not yet been conquered. In Muzaffarabad, the local Rajput clans of Khakha and Bambah led a resistance against Sikh conquest. A Sikh army was then dispatched from Srinagar and defeated them, declaring Sikh suzerainty over Muzaffarabad.

In Poonch, the Sudhans were at the head of resistance against the Sikhs. The Sudhans were led by a local chieftain Shams Khan, and the Sudhan sardars Sabz Ali and Malli Khan. They worked in collaboration with other Muslim tribes of Poonch to form an effective coalition against the Sikhs. The Sikhs were unable to launch a large-scale invasion of Poonch, as the resistance was staunch and they had problems elsewhere.

After Gulab Singh received the chakla of Jammu as a jagir (autonomous territory), he made renewed attempts at conquering Poonch, but the armies he raised were not large enough to defeat the Sudhan led resistance, and consequently he would face defeats before being forced to withdraw.

This continued for several years, until 1832, when Gulab Singh and his brother Dhian Singh made an appeal to Ranjit Singh, requesting him to put an end to the Sudhan-led resistance of Poonch. Ranjit Singh obliged, and marched with an army of 60,000 with a large assortment of hill-cannons.

Ranjit Singh's army was overwhelmingly superior in arms and number, with the deadly hill-cannons wreaking havoc upon the local territories. Consequently, Shams Khan and the other sardars made the decision to sue for peace. Ranjit Singh accepted their surrender, as the tribes acknowledged his suzerainty over Poonch. Shams Khan was taken as a hostage, to ensure the tribes would not rebel.

== 1837 Sudhan revolt ==
Shams Khan (also known as Shams-Ud-Din Khan) was an influential zamindar of Poonch and headman of the Sudhans was the leader of the 1837 rebellion. After the prior successful conquest of Poonch, the local tribes of the region, including the Sudhans, had been pacified. From the Sudhans, Shams Khan was taken as a hostage and given to the care of Dhian Singh, who began to grow a liking for him.

In 1836, he returned to Poonch and began to take charge once again. At around the same time, the Yusufzai began a revolt, distracting the Sikhs and the leader of the Dogras, Gulab Singh. Rumors of a Sikh defeat began to spread, which in turn began the rise of clashes throughout Poonch between the locals and Sikh garrisons. Gulab Singh gained intelligence that Shams Khan was behind this, and called for the arrest of him and his family. Shams eluded the chasing authorities.

After this, an all-out rebellion broke out. The local Muslim tribes too joined the Sudhans and began amassing their armies. Gulab Singh ordered his son Ottam Singh to suppress the revolt before it grew further in strength. Ottam Singh arrived with a Dogra force of five thousand troops, but was defeated by rebels commandeered by Shams and his lieutenants. The prince himself was able to escape with some remnants of the army, but now Poonch was laid bare to the rebels.

Assaults over local forts began, resulting in great success. The garrisons were caught off-guard and ill-prepared, and fell to the attacking rebel armies. Some soldiers of the garrisons, whom had previously treated the locals with cruelty were cut-up with their corpses fed to dogs.

Following the defeats, Gulab Singh quickly forced the Yusufzai into peace, and then marched to Kahuta, where he raised an army of eight thousand regular infantry and twelve thousand irregulars. Though Gulab had raised a sizeable and professional army, he chose not to engage the rebellion immediately to minimise the number of Dogra casualties. He focused on bribing local Sardars of the various tribes and the many enemies of Shams, promising lavish rewards or positions of power if they betrayed Shams and the Sudhan-led rebels. This either neutralised them as foes, or turned a small number to his side completely, resulting in them aiding Gulab with either information or later fighting against the rebels. Thus Gulab had successfully incited treachery within some ranks of the rebellion.

After this, Gulab made his way to Poonch through Jhelum, and after some initial victories against local tribes, he paved way towards the Sudhan heartland, aiming to defeat the Sudhans who were both the leaders of the rebellion and made up the majority of its forces. Major clashes occurred at Pallandri, Pallangi, Pachhiot, Paral, Panthal, Baral, Narian and Chokian, alongside smaller clashes in other areas. The deadliest battle occurred in the Sudhan stronghold of Mong, where the local Sudhans both dealt and received heavy casualties. Although the rebels temporarily pushed out occupying Dogra forces in some areas, with the aid of Sikh reinforcements, Gulab counterattacked and overwhelmed the rebels. Many Sudhan commanders and notables were captured, including two sardars (scions) Malli Khan and Sabz Ali Khan, whom alongside Shams were at the head of both the tribe and the rebellion. Thus the remaining rebels had also lost key leaders.

To spread terror throughout the ranks of the rebels, Gulab Singh devastated all captured territories, permitting total plunder and terror in great excess. He also set a reward of five rupees for the head of every insurgent and anyone that was connected to him, regardless of age or gender. The remaining rebels were outmatched both in number and arms. Realizing the hopelessness of the situation, the rebellion collapsed as the rebels raced to protect their own families. Though the majority of the local population managed to escape Gulab's forces by taking refuge in nearby hills, their homes were looted, fields destroyed and cattle seized. Those who could not escape were either massacred or enslaved.

Shams Khan had evaded arrest up to this point, but eventually had his hiding place exposed to the Dogras. He was beheaded, alongside his nephew Rajwali. As a result, any remnants of the rebellion ended as the main leader of the Sudhans and the rebels was now dead. The heads of Shams and his nephew were later put in two cages of iron at the very top of the Adha Dek pass. The captured sardars Sabz Ali Khan and Malli Khan were flayed alive, alongside other commanders and notable members of the Sudhans and other rebellious tribes. As all ring leaders were now either dead or captured, any remaining insurgents now in hiding, alongside no remaining resistance, the conflict was concluded and Gulab withdrew his forces.

Though the majority of the local populace of Poonch and the Sudhans had survived by taking refuge in the hills, they returned home to barren fields and ransacked homes, alongside the deaths or disappearances of many relatives, including non-combatants and those who had nothing to do with the rebellion. The cruelty shown by the Dogra forces was not forgotten, with British contemporaries being appalled at the treatment of the rebellious tribes and the people of Poonch as a whole by Gulab. In 1846, after the Dogra Kingdom of Jammu and Kashmir was created and became a princely state of the British, Gulab Singh was forced to address the issue of his cruelty. He claimed that the actions of him and his forces were vengeance for the treatment the rebels imposed upon Dogra garrisons, and that he had only flayed alive three ring-leaders, though the locals claimed otherwise. To appease the British, he requested an advisor by whose counsel he would avoid further tyrannical action.

== Role in the 1947 Poonch revolt ==
The Sudhans played a monumental role in the rebellion against the Dogra Kingdom of Jammu and Kashmir. Spearheaded by Sardar Ibrahim Khan, they backed a movement supporting secession to Pakistan, which ultimately turned into an all-out revolt and later establishment of Azad Kashmir.

A large number of Sudhan tribals had participated in World War I and World War II through the British Indian Army. They had thus obtained expertise in war and some number of arms, which emboldened them to once again stand against the Dogra authorities, whom they had always been keen on expelling. The occurrence of the 1947 Jammu Massacres also served as motivation for the Muslims to revolt. Leveraging these advantages, Sardar Ibrahim Khan and his cause found much support from his tribe alongside other local Muslims living in what is now Azad Kashmir.

The Sudhans obtained further weaponry from the Pashtuns of FATA, prior to the break-out of rebellion. After rebellion was officially declared, a rebel force (dubbed the 'Azad Army'), made up of local militiamen and veterans from mainly the Sudhans, alongside a smaller number of Dhunds of Bagh, was raised in Poonch. Influential Sudhan figures, such as Khan Muhammad Khan, and Hussain Khan played key roles in raising the rebel forces. The local Dogra garrisons were overwhelmed and defeated, with a provisional government declared with its capital in the Sudhan stronghold of Pallandri, which was later followed by a capture of the majority of the Poonch district. Succeeding this, Pashtun lashkars arrived as reinforcements, all of which caused widespread collapse of Dogra authority in the Kingdom, which ultimately culminated in the creation of Azad Kashmir, Dogra Kingdom of Jammu and Kashmir's secession to India and the subsequent Indo-Pakistani war of 1947–1948.

== 1955 Poonch uprising ==
Sudhans played an immense role in the 1955 Poonch rebellion, who revolted against the appointment of Sher Ahmed Khan and dismissal of Sardar Ibrahim Khan. The violent anti government protestors demanded regional autonomy, especially in the administration and for budgets.

=== Baral Agreement ===
The Baral Agreement was an agreement between the Government of Pakistan and rebellious Sudhan tribes signed on 20 December 1956 following the 1955 uprising.

== Politics ==
=== First Government of Azad Kashmir ===
On 4 October 1947, Azad Kashmir's First Government was established in Sudhanoti. Sudhanoti is the home and centre of the Sudhans, with the tribe overwhelmingly dominating the population of the tehsil. By 4 October 1947, the rebellion led by the Sudhans successfully captured their heartland from the Dogra regime. As there was no parliamentary house present in Sudhanoti from where the proclaimed government could be run, a temporary government structure was established and run from Moti Mahal in Rawalpindi.

By 24 October, the rebel-founded government of Azad Kashmir prepared a 40-room parliamentary house at Sudhanoti's Chonjal Hill in Pallandri, to where the government was shifted. The government was transferred to Muzaffarabad on 1 August 1949. One of the main reasons for the transfer were the growing differences between the Sudhan tribals and the Government of Pakistan, with the Sudhans demanding greater autonomy. This would later culminate into the 1955 Poonch uprising.

== Notable people ==
- Shams Khan (otherwise known as Shams-Ud-Din), tribal chieftain, local governor of Poonch, and rebel leader during the 1837 Poonch Revolt
- Malli Khan, sardar of the tribe and rebel leader during the 1837 Poonch Revolt
- Sabaz Ali Khan, sardar of the tribe and rebel leader during the 1837 Poonch Revolt
- Muhammad Ibrahim Khan, longest-serving president of Azad Kashmir
- Sher Ahmed Khan, rebel leader during the First Kashmir War and former president of Azad Kashmir
- Captain Hussain Khan, rebel leader during the First Kashmir War
- Khan Muhammad Khan of Mang, rebel leader during the First Kashmir War
- Khan Muhammad Khan, politician who served as the Chairman of the War Council during the 1947 Poonch Rebellion
- Aziz Khan, 11th Chairman Joint Chiefs of Staff Committee (CJCSC) of Pakistan Armed Forces
