= Poonch Division =

Administrative division of Azad Kashmir, Pakistan

- Division of Azad Kashmir administered by Pakistan

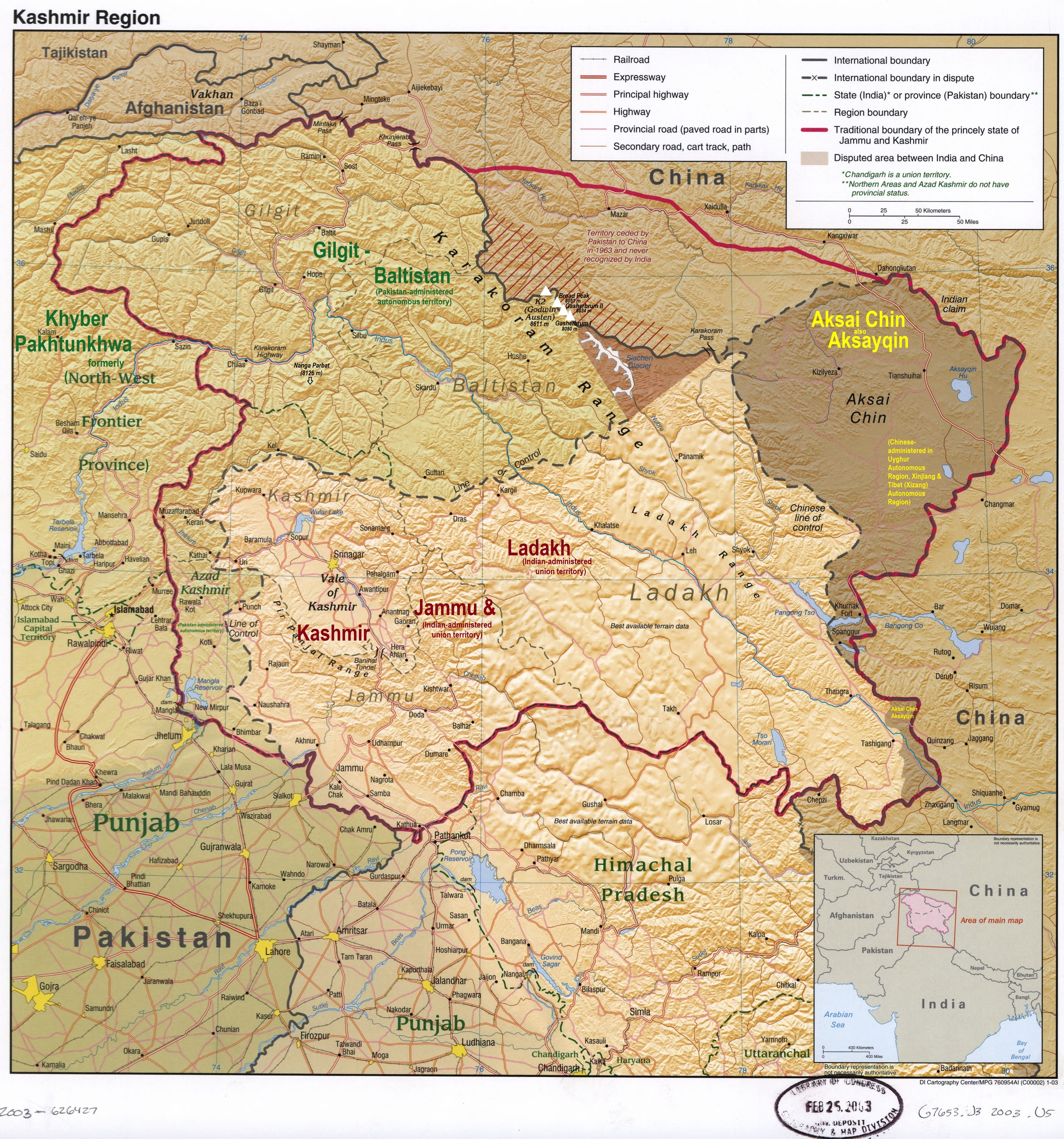
- A map showing Pakistani-administered Azad Kashmir (shaded in sage green) in the disputed Kashmir region
- Administering country: Pakistan
- Territory: Azad Kashmir
- Capital: Rawalakot

Government
  - Type: Divisional Administration
  - Commissioner: N/A
  - Regional Police Officer: N/A

Population (2017)
  - Total: 1,322,198

The Poonch Division (Urdu: پونچھ ڈِوِژن) is a first-order administrative division of the Pakistani–administered territory of Azad Kashmir in the disputed Kashmir. It comprises the portion of the former Poonch Jagir of the princely state of Jammu and Kashmir that came under Pakistani control at the end of the Indo-Pakistani War of 1947.

== Administrative districts ==
Currently, the Poonch Division consists of the following districts:

District	Area (km²)	Pop. (2017)	Density (ppl/km²) (2017)	Literacy rate (2017)	Union Councils
Poonch District	855	500,571	585		4
Bagh District	770	371,919	483		3
Haveli District	598	152,124	254		3
Sudhanoti District	569	297,584	523		4
