= Sudhanoti District =

District in Azad Kashmir, Pakistan

Sudhanoti District ضلع سدھنوتی
- District of Azad Kashmir administered by Pakistan
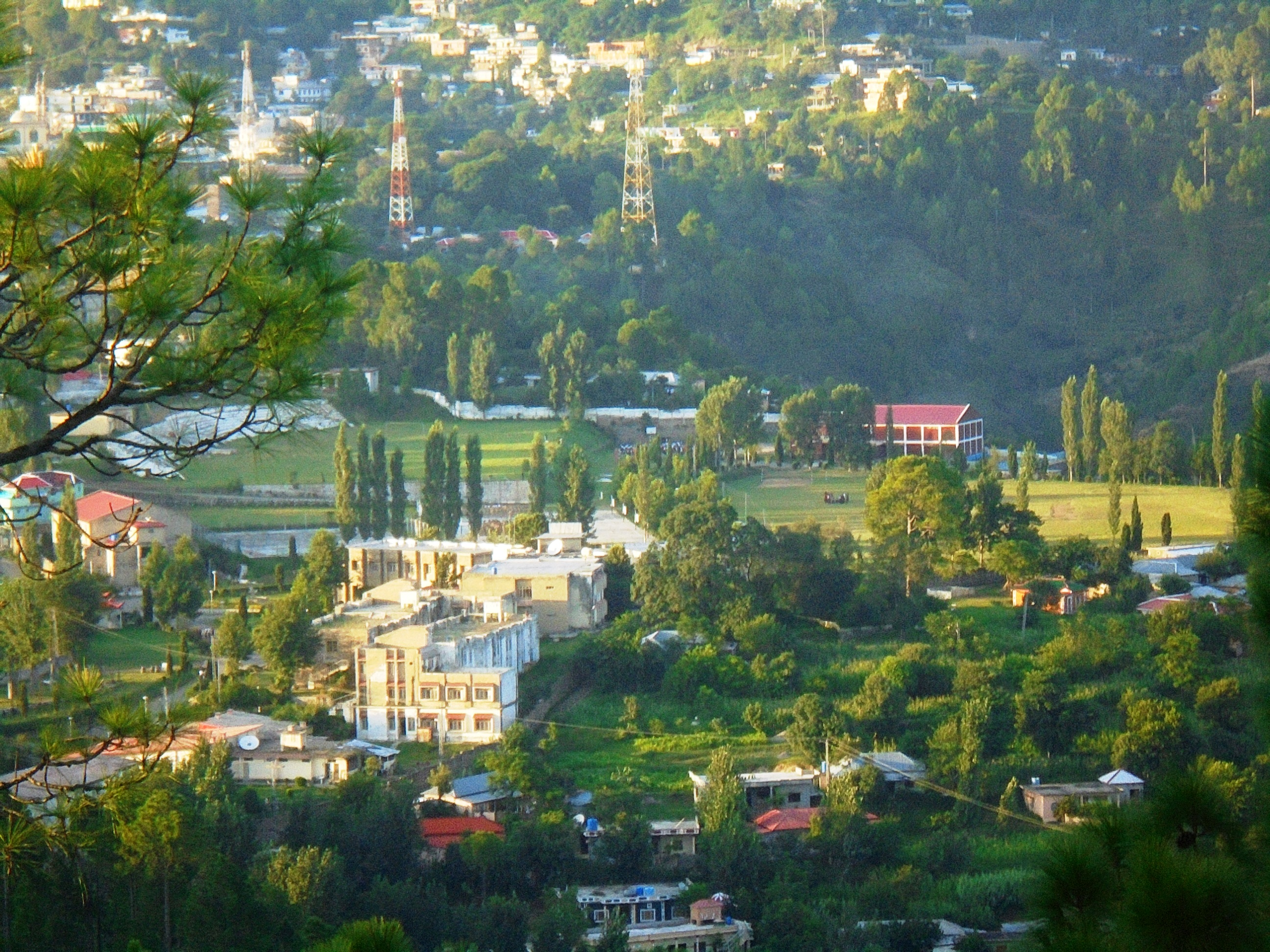
- A view of Cadet College Pallandri in the Sudhanoti District
- Interactive map of Sudhanoti district
- Map of Azad Kashmir with the Sudhanoti District highlighted in red
- Coordinates (Pallandri Tehsil): 33°40′N 73°43′E
- Administering country: Pakistan
- Territory: Azad Kashmir
- Division: Poonch Division
- Headquarters: Pallandri

Government
  - Type: District Administration

Area
  - Total: 569 km^{2} (220 sq mi)

Population (2017)
  - Total: 297,584
  - Density: 523/km^{2} (1,350/sq mi)

Languages
  - Official: Urdu
  - Spoken: Poonchi, Gujari, Hindko, Kashmiri
- Time zone: UTC+5 (PST)
- Number of Tehsils: 4
- Website: sudhanoti.com

Sudhanoti (or Sudhnoti, Urdu: سدھنوتی) is a district of Pakistan-administered Azad Kashmir in the disputed Kashmir region. The district is bounded on the north and east by the Poonch District, on the south by the Kotli District, and on the west by the Rawalpindi District of Punjab. It is located 90 kilometres (56 mi) from Islamabad, the capital of Pakistan. It is connected with Rawalpindi and Islamabad via the Azad Pattan Road.

The district headquarters is the town of Pallandri. It lies at an elevation of 1,372 meters and is at a distance of 97 kilometers from Rawalpindi via the Azad Pattan Road.

== Administrative divisions ==
The Sudhanoti District is divided into four tehsils:

- Baloch Tehsil
- Mang Tehsil
- Pallandri Tehsil
- Trarkhel Tehsil

== History ==
Sudhnoti (now called Sudhanoti) was first established as a tehsil of the Poonch jagir by Raja Moti Singh, the ruler of Poonch in the second half of the 19th century. In the Dogra era, the tehsil of Sudhanoti was larger as it included much of the modern day Poonch district in Azad Kashmir.

== Demographics ==
=== Population ===
The population of Sudhnoti was recorded as 297,584 in the 2017 census.

=== Social groups ===
Up to 85% of the district's population is estimated to be inhabited by the Sudhan tribe. The second major ethnic group is the Gujjar, who makes up 4% of the district's population and speak Gujari language. Other minority groups include Awan, Sayed, Qureshi and Kashmiri Muslims.

=== Language ===
The primary spoken language is the Poonchi dialect of Pahari, spoken by an estimated 95% of the district's population. Gujari is spoken by 4% of the population. Other languages like Hindko and Kashmiri are spoken by 1% of the population.

1. Pahari (Poonchi) (95.0%)
2. Gujari (Gojri) (4.00%)
3. Other (Hindko & Kashmiri) (1.00%)

== Education ==
According to the Alif Ailaan Pakistan District Education Rankings 2017, Sudhanoti is ranked 34 out of 155 districts with a score of 68.85 in terms of education. For facilities and infrastructure, the district is ranked last with the very low score of 6.76.

Educational institutes include:

- Mirpur University of Science & Technology (MUST) Pallandri campus, Sudhanoti District
- Mohi-ud-Din Islamic University Nerian Sharif, a chartered university situated 125 km west of Islamabad
- University of Poonch (SM campus, Mang, Sudhanoti District)

== Notables ==
- Aziz Khan, General of the Pakistan Army and Chairman of the Joint Chiefs of Staff Committee
- Khan Muhammad Khan, Politician and the Chairman of the War Council during the 1947 Poonch Rebellion
- Muhammad Alauddin Siddiqui, Islamic Sufi Scholar and 2nd custodian of Nerian Sharif, Tarar Khel. He died on 3 February 2017.

== See also ==
- History of Kashmir
