= 1947 Jammu massacres =

Genocidal massacres in Jammu

- Date: October 1947 – November 1947
- Location: Jammu province, Princely state of Jammu and Kashmir
- Goals: Genocide, ethnic cleansing
- Methods: Rioting, pogrom, arson, mass rape

Parties
Rashtriya Swayamsevak Sangh; Akalis; Jammu Hindus	Jammu Muslims

Casualties
- Deaths: 20,000–100,000 Muslims; A large number of Hindus and Sikhs in Rajouri, and in Mirpur.

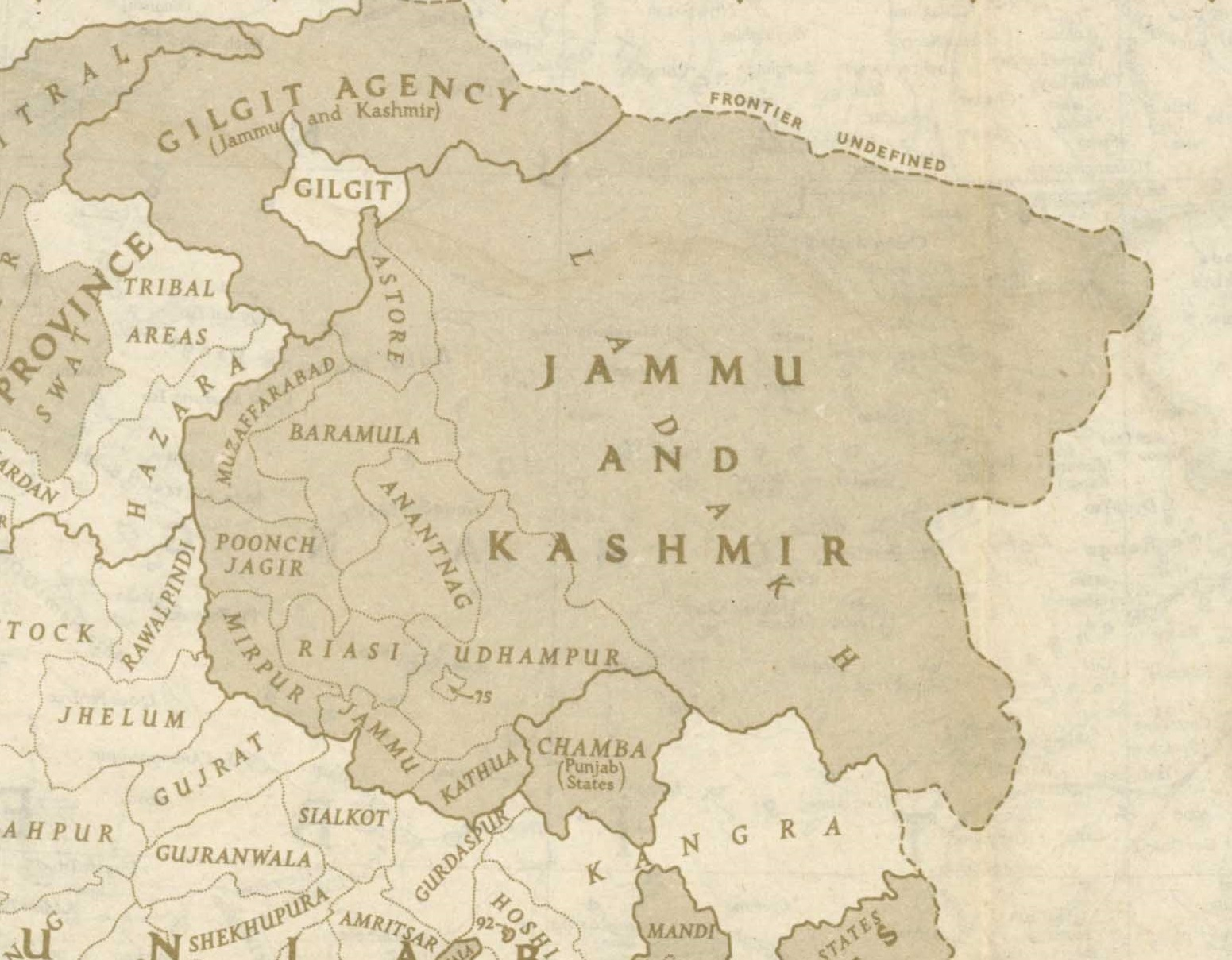
The Jammu province of the princely state of Jammu and Kashmir (1946) consisted of the Poonch, Mirpur, Riasi, Jammu, Kathua, and Udhampur districts

After the Partition of India, during October–November 1947 in the Jammu region of the princely state of Jammu and Kashmir, many Muslims were massacred and others driven away to West Punjab. The killings were carried out by extremist Hindus and Sikhs, aided and abetted by the forces of Maharaja Hari Singh. The activists of the Rashtriya Swayamsevak Sangh (RSS) played a key role in planning and executing the riots. An estimated 20,000–100,000 Muslims were massacred. Subsequently, many non-Muslims were massacred by Pakistani tribesmen, in the Mirpur region of today's Pakistani administered Kashmir, (Note: Christopher Snedden writes of unverifiable allegations of 20,000 non-Muslims killed in Mirpur.) and also in the Rajouri area of Jammu division.

== Background ==
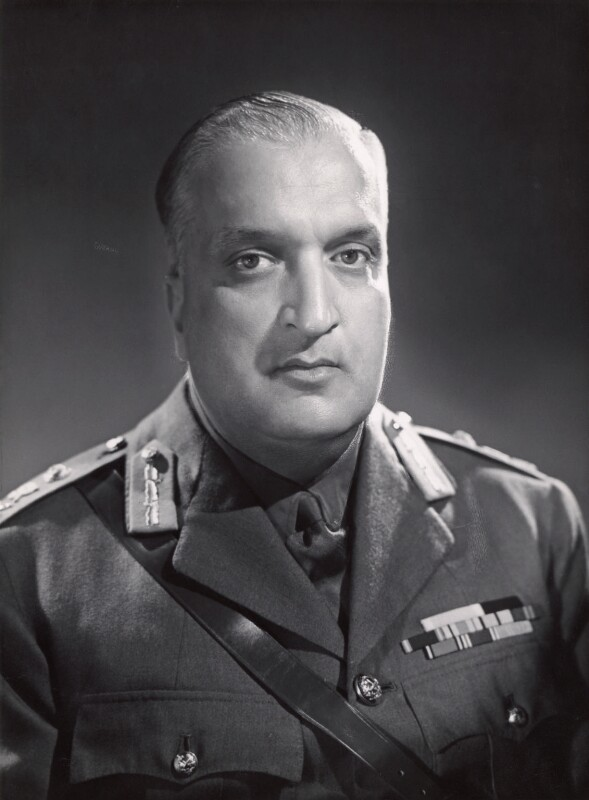
Maharaja Hari Singh of Jammu and Kashmir

At the time of the Partition of India in 1947, the British abandoned their suzerainty over the princely states, which were left with the options of joining India or Pakistan or remaining independent. Hari Singh, the Maharaja of Jammu and Kashmir, indicated his preference to remain independent of the new dominions. All the major political groups of the state supported the Maharaja's decision, except for the Muslim Conference, which declared in favour of accession to Pakistan on 19 July 1947. The Muslim Conference was popular among Muslims in the Jammu province of the state. It was closely allied with the All-India Muslim League, which was set to inherit Pakistan.

Sardar Ibrahim, the Muslim Conference leader from Poonch used a raising head of unrest fuelled by economic grievances, turning it into a rebellion against the Maharaja and demanding accession to Pakistan. Soon Pakistan got involved. On 12 September 1947, the Pakistani prime minister Liaquat Ali Khan called a meeting in Lahore where it was decided to support the rebels and to launch an invasion from Pakistan. A 'GHQ Azad' was established under Major General Zaman Kiani (formerly of the Indian National Army) in Gujrat, which started conducting raids against the Jammu border.

=== Communal situation in the State ===
Maharaja Hari Singh was seen by informed observers as liberal and non-sectarian, even though, in the run-up to the Partition, he was believed to have come under the influence of the Arya Samaj. At least a third of the state army and over half of its police force was Muslim. Both the army and police were headed by British officers until 3 October (Major General Henry Lawrence Scott, Chief of Staff, and Richard Powell, Inspector General of Police). After they stepped down, they were replaced by 'Hindu officers', according to British reports. The Jammu Brigade and the Jammu police were still headed by Muslim officers (Brigadier Khuda Baksh, commanding the Jammu Brigade, and Mian Abdul Rashid, Senior Superintendent of Police).

From June 1946 onwards, the Muslim Conference is reported to have tightened its connections with Pakistan's Muslim League, importing its leaders into the state and starting to train 'National Guards'. Its new leaders (Agha Shaukat Ali for general secretary and Chaudhry Ghulam Abbas for president) were "working up anti-Hindu sentiments under the guise of uniting all Muslims", according to the British Resident in Kashmir. The Resident also reported that, in March 1947, Pir of Manki Sharif (from the North-West Frontier Province) sent his agents to prepare the people for a 'holy crusade' to be carried out by frontier tribes soon after the departure of the British.

Also in March 1947, following the massacres in Rawalpindi, large numbers of Hindus and Sikhs from Rawalpindi and Sialkot started arriving in Jammu, bringing "harrowing stories of Muslim atrocities in West Punjab". According to scholar Ilyas Chattha, this eventually provoked counter-violence on Jammu Muslims, which had "many parallels with that in Sialkot". Scholar Prem Shankar Jha states that, though the arrival of refugees caused considerable unease in Jammu, the city remained free of communal disturbances till the end of September 1947.

During August–September 1947, roughly 100,000 Muslims from East Punjab and an equal number of non-Muslims from West Punjab were safely escorted through Jammu by Jammu and Kashmir State Forces.

== Violence against Jammu Muslims ==
According to scholar Ian Copland, the Jammu and Kashmir administration carried out a pogrom against its Muslim subjects in Jammu partly out of revenge for the Poonch rebellion that started earlier.

Some observers state that a main aim of Hari Singh and his administration was to alter the demographics of the region by eliminating the Muslim population, in order to ensure a Hindu majority in the region.

Scholar Ilyas Chattha and Jammu journalist Ved Bhasin blame the mishandling of law and order by Maharaja Hari Singh and his armed forces in Jammu, for the large scale communal violence in the region.

=== Massacres ===
On 14 October, the RSS activists and the Akalis attacked various villages of Jammu district—Amrey, Cheak, Atmapur and Kochpura—and after killing some Muslims, looted their possessions and set their houses on fire. There was mass killing of Muslims in and around Jammu city. The state troops led the attacks. The state officials provided arms and ammunition to the rioters. The administration had demobilised many Muslim soldiers in the state army and had discharged Muslim police officers. (Note: According to the accounts of refugees, the Maharaja was "in person commanding all the forces which were ethnically cleansing the Muslims".) Most of the Muslims outside the Muslim dominated areas were killed by the communal rioters who moved in vehicles with arms and ammunition, though the city was officially put under curfew. Many Gujjar men and women who used to supply milk to the city from the surrounding villages were reportedly massacred en route. It is said that the Ramnagar reserve in Jammu was littered with the dead bodies of Gujjar men, women and children. In the Muslim localities of Jammu city, Talab Khatikan and Mohalla Ustad, Muslims were surrounded and were denied water supply and food. The Muslims in Talab Khatikan area had joined to defend themselves with the arms they could gather, who later received support from the Muslim Conference. They were eventually asked to surrender and the administration asked them to go to Pakistan for their safety. These Muslims and others who wanted to go to Sialkot, in thousands, were loaded in numerous trucks and were escorted by the troops in the first week of November. When they reached the outskirts of the city, they were pulled out and killed by armed Sikhs and RSS men, while abducting the women.

There were also reports of large-scale massacres of Muslims in Udhampur district, particularly in proper Udhampur, Chenani, Ramnagar, Bhaderwah and Reasi areas. Killing of numerous Muslims was reported from Chhamb, Deva Batala, Manawsar and other parts of Akhnoor with many people fleeing to Pakistan or moving to Jammu. In Kathua district and Billawar area, there was extensive killing of Muslims with women being raped and abducted.

On 16 November 1947, Sheikh Abdullah arrived in Jammu and a refugee camp was set up in Mohalla Ustad.

=== Observations ===
"To recall those days of communal orgy my only objective is to point out that a communalist and killer has no religion. It was the humanity that was the victim of communal fanatics... we should better learn appropriate lessons from history and not allow the communal fanatics of one or the other community to vitiate the atmosphere and disturb communal peace and harmony."

— Ved Bhasin, who witnessed the Jammu violence in 1947.

Mahatma Gandhi commented on the situation in Jammu on 25 December 1947 in his speech at a prayer meeting in New Delhi: "The Hindus and Sikhs of Jammu and those who had gone there from outside killed Muslims. The Maharaja of Kashmir is responsible for what is happening there…A large number of Muslims have been killed there and Muslim women have been dishonoured."

According to Ved Bhasin and scholar Ilyas Chattha, the Jammu riots were executed by members of the Rashtriya Swayamsevak Sangh (RSS) who were joined by the refugees from West Pakistan, and were supported strongly by Hari Singh and his administration with a main aim to change the demographic composition of Jammu region and ensure a non-Muslim majority. Bhasin states, the riots were "clearly" planned by the activists of RSS. Observers have noted that the Akali Sikhs and some former members of the Indian National Army (INA) also participated in this violence along with the RSS and state forces.

Bhasin says that the massacres took place in the presence of the then Jammu and Kashmir's Prime Minister Mehr Chand Mahajan and the governor of Jammu, Lala Chet Ram Chopra, and that some of those who led these riots in Udhampur and Bhaderwah later joined the National Conference with some of them also serving as ministers. (Note: Ved Bhasin (17 November 2015), Jammu 1947, Kashmir Life: "Another incident that I recall is about Mr Mehr Chand Mahajan who told a delegation of Hindus who met him in the palace when he arrived in Jammu that now when the power is being transferred to the people they should better demand parity. When one of them associated with National Conference asked how can they demand parity when there is so much difference in population ratio. Pointing to the Ramnagar rakh below, where some bodies of Muslims were still lying he said "the population ratio too can change".)

=== Estimates of people killed and displaced ===
An early official calculation made in Pakistan, using headcount data, estimated 50,000 Muslims killed. A team of two Englishmen jointly commissioned by the governments of India and Pakistan investigated seven major incidents of violence between 20 October – 9 November 1947, estimating 70,000 deaths. Scholar Ian Copland estimated total deaths to be around 80,000, while Ved Bhasin estimated them to be around 100,000. Scholar Christopher Snedden says, the number of Muslims killed were between 20,000 and 100,000. Justice Yusuf Saraf estimates them to be between 20,000 and 30,000.

Much higher figures were reported by newspapers at that time. A report by a special correspondent of The Times, published on 10 August 1948, stated that a total of 237,000 Muslims were either killed or migrated to Pakistan. (Note: To quote 10 August 1948 report published in The Times: "237,000 Muslims were systematically exterminated – unless they escaped to Pakistan along the border – by the forces of the Dogra State headed by the Maharaja in person and aided by Hindus and Sikhs. This happened in October 1947, five days before the Pathan invasion and nine days before the Maharaja’s accession to India." The number of 237,000 was out of 411,000 Muslims said to have lived in the 'eastern Jammu' province. No calculations for the exact figure were given and the figure was not broken down into deaths and escapes. The 'Special Correspondent' that authored the report is later identified as Frederick Paul Mainprice, the former Assistant Political Agent of the Gilgit Agency, who worked as a Deputy Secretary for the Pakistan government during 1948–49 "specialising on the Kashmir problem".) The editor of The Statesman Ian Stephens claimed that 500,000 Muslims, "the entire Muslim element of the population", was eliminated and 200,000 "just disappeared". Scholar Ian Copland finds these figures dubious. (Note: Copland, State, Community and Neighbourhood 2005, p. 153: "None of these figures, however, are authoritative.... And the Times man, too, seems to have harboured Pakistani sympathies and, more importantly, offers no clues as to the source of his information.")

The Pakistani newspaper Nawa-i-Waqt reported that more than 100,000 Jammu refugees had arrived in Sialkot by 20 November 1947. Snedden, on the other hand, cites a "comprehensive report" in Dawn, which said that 200,000 Muslims went as refugees to Pakistan in October–November 1947. An unidentified organisation in Pakistan counted refugees from Jammu and Kashmir during May–July 1949, and found 333,964 refugees from the Indian-held parts of the state. Of these, an estimated 100,000 refugees returned to their homes in 1949–1950, leaving an estimated 233,964 refugees in Pakistan. Based on the electoral rolls of Pakistan-administered Kashmir in 1970, the number that remained in Pakistan is estimated to be in the range 219,718 – 259,047.

== Violence against Hindus and Sikhs in Rajouri and Mirpur ==
Muslims in the western districts of Poonch jagir began an agitation against taxes in mid-1947, which escalated into an armed rebellion against Hari Singh's government, and expanded to Mirpur district. In October 1947, a force of Pathan tribesman crossed into Kashmir from Pakistan's North-West Frontier Province and the adjoining princely states and tribal areas. The rebels took control of most of the countryside in these districts by the end of the month, driving non-Muslims to seek shelter in towns where the State troops were garrisoned. Beginning on 24 October, the towns themselves fell to the rebels: Bhimber (24 October), Rajauri (7 November), and Mirpur (25 November).

=== Rajouri ===
Rajouri was held by the "Azad Kashmir forces", or rebels from Poonch, and the raiders, until April 1948, when the town was taken by the Indian armed forces. The Hindus facing this persecution included the town's residents as well as those displaced from the surrounding countryside. Some Hindus were able to escape, while others were sheltered by sympathetic Muslims. Mass suicides and killings, including by beheading or poisoning, occurred among women, sometimes at the hands of men in their family. These were the result of fears that they would be sexually abused by the raiders. The capture of Rajouri from the raiders is commemorated on 13 April, and a monument was erected to honour the incident in the town.

=== Mirpur ===
After the Indian army repelled the Pashtun raiders from near Srinagar on 25 November, the raiders turned to Mirpur, in present-day Azad Kashmir. Political scientist Christopher Snedden writes of unverifiable allegations that 20,000 non-Muslims were killed on and shortly after 25 November in Mirpur, and a further 2500 were abducted. In the district of Mirpur and nearby regions of Poonch, Hindu and Sikh women were also raped and abducted. November 25 is now commemorated as "Mirpur Day" in Indian-administered Kashmir.

== Population figures ==
The table below compares the 1941 percentage of Muslim population with the present percentage for the Indian-administered part of the Jammu province and gives figures for estimated 'loss' of Muslims, due to deaths as well as migration.

Region	1941 Population	1947 Population (est) (Note: Obtained by extrapolating the 1931–1941 growth rate.)	1941 Muslim proportion	2011 Muslim proportion	Loss of Muslims (est) (Note: These figures are notional. They represent the number of Muslims lost to the state, due to either deaths or out-migration, so that the 2011 demographic percentage could have been obtained. It is derived by multiplying the 1947 population figure by the factor (1941 percentage – 2011 percentage)/(100 – 2011 percentage). If there was in-migration of Muslims or if the Muslim population grew at faster rate than the rest, these figures would be underestimates. If there was in-migration of non-Muslims, these figures would be overestimates.) (Note: These figures would also include any further out-migration of Muslims after 1947, for example during and after the 1965 war.)
Jammu District (Note: The 1947 Jammu district is now divided into Jammu and Samba districts)	431,362	468,988	39.6%	7.1%	164,182
Kathua District	177,672	188,330	25.3%	10.4%	31.341
Udhampur District (inc. Chenani) (Note: The 1947 Udhampur district is now divided into Ramban, Udhampur, Doda and Kishtwar districts)	306,013	319,631	42.7%	41.5%	6,241
Reasi District (Note: The 1947 Reasi district is now divided into Reasi and Rajouri districts)	257,903	272,532	68.1%	58.4%	63.196
Jammu province (exc. Poonch and Mirpur)	1,172,950	1,249,029	44.5%	27.9%	264,960
Poonch jagir	421,828	443,948	90.0%	90.4%	–

Present day district map of Jammu and Kashmir

Scholar Ian Copland tries to estimate how many Muslims might have been killed in the Jammu violence based on demographic data. If the headcount figure of 333,964 refugees from the Indian-administered parts of the state is used to calculate an estimate, one ends up with a surplus rather than a deficit. (Note: An even higher figure of 500,000 Muslim refugees was reported in Dawn on 2 January 1951. Scholar Ilyas Chattha has claimed that over 1 million Muslims were uprooted owing to the violence. Evidently, such high figures are not supported by the demographic data.) However, Justice Yusuf Saraf estimates that 100,000 Jammu refugees returned to their homes in 1949–1950. (Note: Jammu and Kashmir government has claimed that 200,000 refugees returned.) If we deduct this 100,000 from the original headcount figure, the estimate of Muslims killed would be a few tens of thousands.

The table below compares the 1941 percentage of 'Hindu & Sikh' population (H/S population) with that in 1951 for the areas of Pakistan-administered Azad Kashmir (comprising 89 per cent of the Mirpur District, 60 per cent of the Poonch Jagir and 87 per cent of the Muzaffarabad District).

Region	1941 Population	1947 Population (est) (Note: Obtained by extrapolating the 1931–1941 growth rate.)	1941 H/S proportion	1951 Population (Note: Figures from the 1951 census of Pakistan. They only cover the areas that came under Pakistani control.)	1951 H/S proportion	Loss of Hindus/Sikhs (est)
Mirpur District	386,655	414,207	19.6%	371,459	–	–
Poonch Jagir	421,828	443,948	10.0%	293,723	–	–
Muzaffarabad District	264,671	282,482	7.1%	220,971	–	–
Azad Kashmir Districts (Note: Mirpur and Poonch were part of the Jammu province in the princely state whereas Muzaffarabad was part of the Kashmir province.)	1,073,154	1,140,637	12.7%	886,153	0.09%	128,988

The Government of Jammu and Kashmir rehabilitated 36,384 refugee families from Azad Kashmir territories. With an average household size of 4.95, (Note: In the 1941 census, the Mirpur district had a population of 547,917 people living in 124,133 households; the Poonch district had a population of 421,828 people in 78,523 households; and the Muzaffarabad district had a population of 264,671 in 46,783 households.) that gives an estimated population of 180,100 people that were killed or displaced from these territories. (Note: This figure is higher than the figure from the 1941 census, possibly because it would have included the Hindu and Sikh populations displaced from Hazara District and Rawalpindi Division who had been given refuge by the Maharaja's administration prior to the Pakistani tribal invasion.) It would not cover the families that might have been completely eliminated by the Azad rebels and tribal raiders.

== See also ==
- Persecution of Muslims
- Violence against Muslims in India
- Timeline of the Kashmir conflict
- Kashmir conflict
- Partition of India

== Bibliography ==
- Abdullah, Sheikh Mohammad (1993), Flames of the Chinar: an autobiography, Viking, ISBN 9780670853182
- Ankit, Rakesh (May 2010). "Henry Scott: The forgotten soldier of Kashmir". Epilogue. Vol. 4, no. 5. pp. 44–49 – via issuu.com.
- Ankit, Rakesh (November 2010). "October 1947". Epilogue. Vol. 4, no. 11. pp. 9–.
- Bhatia, Mohita (2020). Rethinking Conflict at the Margins: Dalits and Borderland Hindus in Jammu and Kashmir: Going Beyond the Dominant Discourse. Cambridge University Press. ISBN 978-1-108-83602-9.
- Bhattacharya, Brigadier Samir (2013), NOTHING BUT!: Book Three: What Price Freedom, Partridge Publishing, ISBN 978-1-4828-1625-9
- Chattha, Ilyas Ahmad (September 2009). Partition and Its Aftermath: Violence, Migration and the Role of Refugees in the Socio-Economic Development of Gujranwala and Sialkot Cities, 1947–1961 (PhD). Centre for Imperial and Post-Colonial Studies, School of Humanities, University of Southampton.

- Since republished as Chattha, Ilyas (2011). Partition and Locality: Violence, Migration and Development in Gujranwala and Sialkot 1947–1961. Oxford University Press. ISBN 9780199061723.

- Chattha, Ilyas (2016). "The Long Shadow of 1947: Partition, Violence and Displacement in Jammu & Kashmir". In Amritjit Singh; Nalini Iyer; Rahul K. Gairola (eds.). Revisiting India's Partition: New Essays on Memory, Culture, and Politics. Lexington Books. pp. 143–156. ISBN 978-1-4985-3105-4.
- Copland, Ian (1991). "The Abdullah Factor: Kashmiri Muslims and the Crisis of 1947". In D. A. Low (ed.). Political Inheritance of Pakistan. Springer. ISBN 9781349115563.
- Copland, Ian (2005). State, Community and Neighbourhood in Princely North India, c. 1900-1950. Palgrave Macmillan UK. pp. 153–. ISBN 978-0-230-00598-3.
- Das Gupta, Jyoti Bhusan (2012) [first published 1968]. Jammu and Kashmir. Springer. ISBN 978-94-011-9231-6.
- Jha, Prem Shankar (1996), Kashmir, 1947: Rival Versions of History, Oxford University Press, ISBN 978-0-19-563766-3
  - Jha, Prem Shankar (2003), The Origins of a Dispute: Kashmir 1947, Oxford University Press, ISBN 978-0-19-566486-7
- Khan, Amanullah (1970), Free Kashmir, Karachi: Central Printing Press
- Nawaz, Shuja (May 2008), "The First Kashmir War Revisited", India Review, 7 (2): 115–154, doi:10.1080/14736480802055455, S2CID 155030407
- Puri, Luv (2012). Across the Line of Control: Inside Pakistan-administered Jammu and Kashmir. Hurst. ISBN 9781849041737.
- Raghavan, Srinath (2010), War and Peace in Modern India: A Strategic History of the Nehru Years, Palgrave Macmillan, ISBN 978-1-137-00737-7
- Saraf, Muhammad Yusuf (2015) [1979], Kashmiris Fight for Freedom, Volume 2, Mirpur: National Institute Kashmir Studies – via archive.org
- Snedden, Christopher (2001). "What happened to Muslims in Jammu? Local identity, '"the massacre" of 1947' and the roots of the 'Kashmir problem'". South Asia: Journal of South Asian Studies. 24 (2): 111–134. doi:10.1080/00856400108723454. S2CID 143991832.
- Snedden, Christopher (2013) [first published as The Untold Story of the People of Azad Kashmir, 2012]. Kashmir: The Unwritten History. HarperCollins India. ISBN 978-9350298985.
- Snedden, Christopher (2015). Understanding Kashmir and Kashmiris. Oxford University Press. ISBN 978-1-84904-342-7.
- Talbot, Ian (1998), Pakistan: A Modern History, St. Martin's Press, ISBN 978-0-312-21606-1
