= Kashmir Day =

Kashmir Day may refer to:

- Kashmir Accession Day (October 26), a commemoration of the accession of Kashmir to India.
- Kashmir Black Day (October 27), a commemoration of Kashmiri people's struggle for right to self-determination.
- Kashmir Martyrs' Day (July 13), a commemoration of the massacres of 1931
- Kashmir Solidarity Day (February 5), a national day in Pakistan
