= 1947 Poonch rebellion =

Rebellion in Jammu and Kashmir

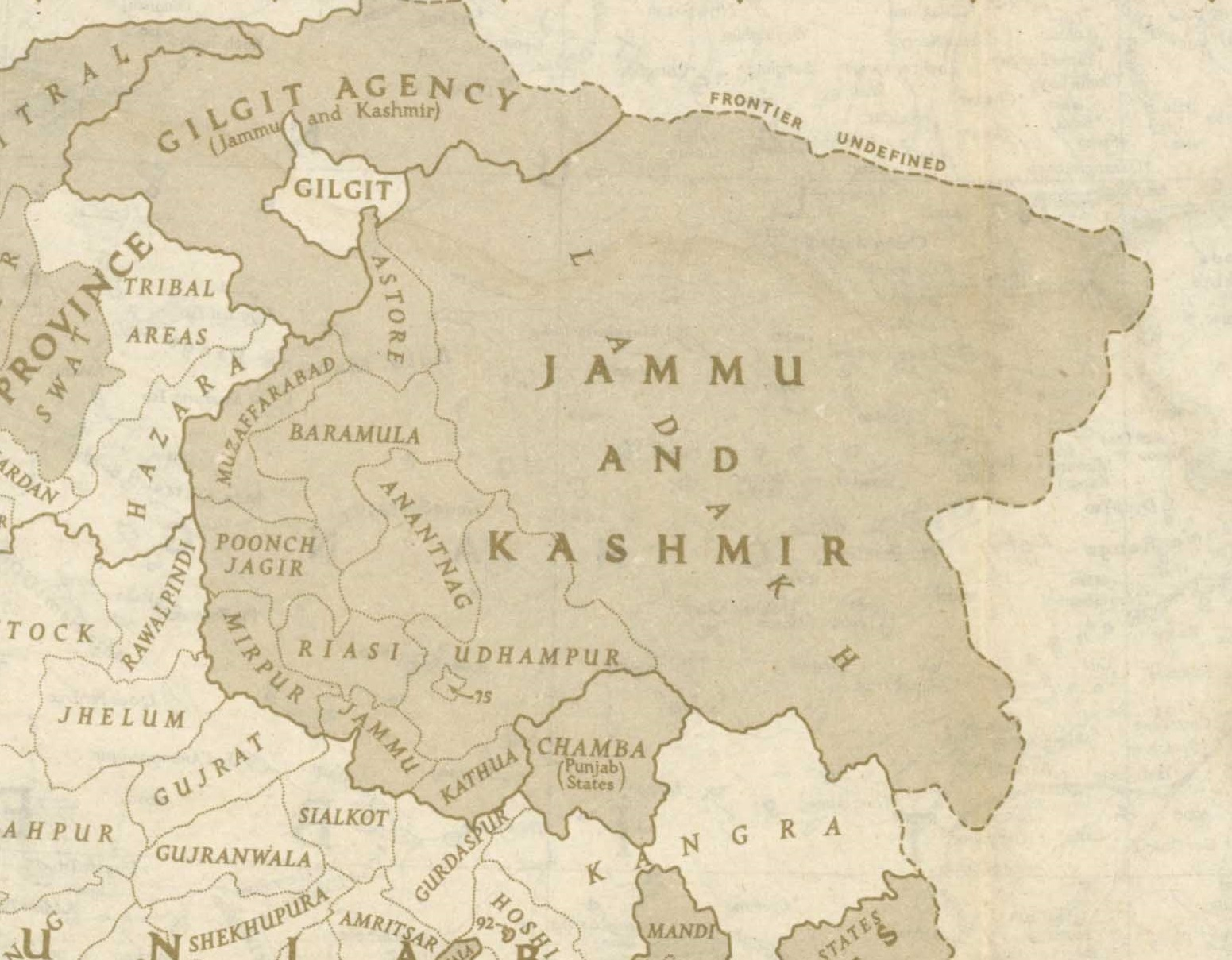
- Poonch Jagir in the southwest of Jammu and Kashmir princely state in 1946
Date	June 1947 – October 1947
Location	Poonch
Result	Rebellion victory: Hari Singh loses control over the region; Formation of Azad Kashmir

Belligerents
Azad Army: Predominantly Sudhans in Poonch; Supported by: Pakistan	Jammu and Kashmir State Forces

Commanders and leaders
Ibrahim Khan (MLA for Poonch); Khan Muhammad (Chairman of the War Council) Hussain Khan	Hari Singh (Maharaja/Ruler); Henry Lawrence Scott (Chief of Staff)

In spring 1947, an uprising against the Maharaja Hari Singh of Jammu and Kashmir broke out in the Poonch jagir, an area bordering the Rawalpindi district of West Punjab and the Hazara district of the North-West Frontier Province in the future Pakistan. It was driven by grievances such as high taxes, the Maharaja's neglect of World War veterans, and above all, Muslim nationalism with a desire to join Pakistan. The leader of the rebellion, Sardar Ibrahim Khan, escaped to Lahore by the end of August 1947 and persuaded the Pakistani authorities to back the rebellion. In addition to the backing, Prime Minister Liaquat Ali Khan authorised an invasion of the state, by the ex-Indian National Army personnel in the south and a force led by Major Khurshid Anwar in the north. These invasions eventually led to the First Kashmir War fought between India and Pakistan, and the formation of Azad Kashmir provisional government. The Poonch jagir has since been divided across Azad Kashmir, administered by Pakistan and the state of Jammu and Kashmir, administered by India.

== Background ==
Poonch was originally an internal jagir (autonomous principality), governed by a related family line of Maharaja Hari Singh. The Muslims of Poonch suffered from small landholdings and high taxation and had nursed their grievances since 1905. The western parts of Poonch were the home of the Sudhan tribe who were one of the first to take up arms against the Dogra rule, playing a significant role in the subsequent rebellion. Sudhans from Poonch considered themselves to be Sadozai Pashtuns, purportedly serving as a motivator for the Pashtun tribesmen from NWFP province to assist the Muslim rebels in Jammu and Kashmir in 1947.

The Sudhans had previously also campaigned for the principality of Poonch to be absorbed into British India. In 1938, a notable disturbance occurred for religious reasons, but a settlement was reached. From then on, a garrison of State troops was established in Poonch to keep order.

After the death of Raja Jagatdev Singh of Poonch in 1940, Maharaja Hari Singh appointed a chosen guardian for his minor son, Shiv Ratandev Singh, and used the opportunity to integrate the Poonch jagir into the state of Jammu and Kashmir. Poonch came to be administered by the officers of Jammu and Kashmir as a district of the Jammu province. This resulted in loss of autonomy for Poonch and subjected its people to the increased taxation of the Kashmir state, both of which were resented by the people.

About 40,000–60,000 Sudhans were recruited and served in the British Indian Army during the First and Second World Wars. After the war, many of them retained their arms while returning. The Maharaja did not (or could not) absorb them into the State forces. (Note: Jammu and Kashmir State Forces had 9 battalions numbering 9,000 men. Absorbing even a small fraction of the ex-servicemen into the forces would have been a tall order.) The absence of employment prospects coupled with high taxation caused displeasure among the Poonchis in 1947.

=== The context of Partition ===
Present day Pakistan bordering Jammu and Kashmir: West Punjab is now renamed as Punjab and the NWFP as Khyber Pakhtunkhwa. East Punjab to the south of Kashmir is unmarked.

At the beginning of 1947, the British Indian provinces of Punjab, to the south and southwest of Kashmir, and North-West Frontier Province (NWFP) to the northwest of Kashmir, were two of the most important provinces of the would-be Pakistan. However, the Muslim League was not in power in either of them. Punjab was held by the Unionists, and the NWFP by Indian National Congress. Undeterred, the Muslim League decided to bring down both the governments, with the help of its private militia Muslim League National Guard in Punjab, and its leaders Pir of Manki Sharif and Khan Abdul Qayyum Khan in the NWFP. These efforts exacerbated Hindu-Sikh-Muslim communal tensions in the two provinces. The trauma was especially acute in the Hazara District, a Muslim League stronghold, which directly bordered the Poonch and Muzaffarabad districts. Between November 1946 and January 1947, Hindu and Sikh refugees poured into Kashmir, with some 2,500 of them under the State care. The plight of these refugees did much to influence the Maharaja's future actions.

On 2 March 1947, the Unionist government in Punjab fell. Immediately, communal fires were set ablaze in Multan, Rawalpindi, Amritsar and Lahore, spreading to, Murree, Taxila and Attock in Punjab. In the NWFP, the Hazara and Peshawar districts were affected.

The Pir of Manki Sharif was also reported to have sent agents provocateurs to the frontier districts of Kashmir to prepare their Muslims for a 'holy war'(jihad). Kashmir responded by sealing the border with the provinces, and sending more troops to the border areas. The stream of Hindu and Sikh refugees coming from the Rawalpindi and Hazara districts also spread unease in the State. Drivers refused to use the Srinagar–Rawalpindi road because of reports of disturbances and raids. (Note: Jha, The Origins of a Dispute (2003), p. 15: "Webb [the British Resident in Kashmir] had reported that Basian and Phagwari, two villages in the Murree hills in Punjab that were inhabited by Hindus and Sikhs which were less than 10 miles from the Kohala border, had been burned. The burning houses could be seen for miles and had triggered the flight of around 200 refugees belonging to the two communities across the Kohala Bridge into Kashmir. This had spread uneasiness in Kashmir province. The state government had dispatched a large number of state troops to Kohala and Ramkot on the Domel Abbottabad road to ensure that the armed raiders did not cross the border.")

Possibly as a result of the defensive measures, the Poonch district came to be militarised. A. H. Suharwardy, former Azad Kashmir civil servant, states that a 'Poonch Brigade' was established by the State Army and distributed at various locations in the Poonch district, such as Rawalakot, ThorarDothan, Mong, Tain, Kapaddar, Chirala, Dhirkot, Kohala, Azad Pattan, Pallandri and Trar Khel, in addition to its headquarters in the Poonch town. (Note: According to the State sources, the so-called "Poonch Brigade" was put together from the existing battalions of the State forces. However, to police the long border, a number of "garrison police companies" were raised and equipped from "ancient stocks" of weaponry. Lord Birdwood mentions the figure of new companies as twelve. They were all non-Muslim.) The militarisation gave rise to many hardships to the local populace and generated resentment. The rigorous restriction on the movement of goods and men between Pakistan and Poonch also generated shortages, causing prices to sky rocket.

=== Political environment in the State ===
The Muslims of Jammu and Kashmir were organised under two political parties: the National Conference led by Sheikh Abdullah, which was allied to the Indian National Congress, and the Muslim Conference led by Chaudhry Ghulam Abbas, which was allied to the Muslim League. The National Conference had almost total control in the Kashmir Valley whereas the Muslim Conference was dominant in the western districts of Jammu province, especially in Mirpur, Poonch and Muzaffarabad. Despite their alliances to the all-India parties, both the parties had ambiguous positions on the accession of the state. The National Conference demanded that the power should be devolved to the people and the people should decide on accession. The Muslim Conference was generally inclined to support accession to Pakistan. But in September 1946, they had passed a resolution in favour of an Azad Kashmir (free Kashmir), though the move came in for criticism within the party.

The Hindus, who were mostly confined to the Jammu province, were organised under Rajya Hindu Sabha led by Prem Nath Dogra, and were allied to the Rashtriya Swayamsevak Sangh. The Jammu Hindus generally regarded the Maharaja as their natural leader and gave him total support.

== Unrest prior to Partition ==
=== Spring 1947 ===
Sardar Abdul Qayyum Khan of the Bagh tehsil (Note: Abdul Qayyum Khan was a twenty-three year old local landlord, who returned from having served in the British Indian Army. During World War II, he served in North Africa and the Middle East and imbibed some of the Muslim ideology of the area. He played a crucial role in the Poonch Rebellion and subsequently became the President of Azad Kashmir in 1956.) is credited with instigating the Poonchis of Bagh and Sudhnoti tehsils in February 1947 not to pay the 'excessive taxes' demanded by the State. This eventually came to be called a 'no tax' campaign. Towards the end of June, the State troops in Poonch ran out of rations and demanded the local populace to provide their supplies. When the populace eventually declared their inability to do so, the Revenue Minister of the State came down to Poonch to collect the tax arrears. This led to renewed repression.

Sardar Ibrahim, the member of Legislative Assembly from Bagh–Sudhnoti, returned to Poonch after attending the Assembly session in March–April. By his own account, he was thoroughly convinced that there was a conspiracy between the State forces and the Rashtriya Swayamsevak Sangh and, so, he advised the people of Poonch to organise themselves politically. As a result of his exhortations, he states, people "got courage, became defiant, and started organising themselves exactly on military lines". On 15 June, he addressed a meeting in Rawalakot attended by 20,000 people, and gave a speech in "most 'seditious' terms". He told his audience that Pakistan, a Muslim state, was coming into being and the people of Jammu and Kashmir could not remain unaffected. After that day, he says, "a strange atmosphere took the place of the usually peaceful life in these parts". On 22 June, Chaudhary Hamidullah, the acting president of the Muslim Conference, visited Rawalakot and initiated secret plans to organise the ex-servicemen of the district for an eventual confrontation with the State Forces.

By the end of July, the Government had clamped Section 144 of the Criminal Procedure Code (prohibiting the assembly of five or more persons) and ordered all the Muslims of Poonch to surrender their arms. (Note: Under the Jammu and Kashmir Arms Act of 1940, the possession of all fire arms was prohibited in the state. The Dogra Rajputs were however exempted from this restriction.) (Note: Though the disarming started in some villages during July–August, it was systematically done in many places only in September.) Muslims complained that the arms deposited by them were distributed by the police to Hindu and Sikh families for self-defence, raising communal fears and tensions. Sardar Ibrahim, back in Srinagar, was confined to the city.

=== August 1947 ===
Sometime in August 1947, the first signs of trouble broke out in Poonch, about which diverging views have been received.

According to state government sources, the demobilised soldiers were moved by the state government's failure to pay them remunerations promised by New Delhi. Rebellious militias gathered in the Palandri–Nowshera–Anantnag area, attacking the state troops and their supply trucks. The state troops were at this time thinly spread escorting refugees between India and Pakistan. A reserve battalion of Sikh troops was dispatched to Poonch, which cleared the roads and dispersed the militias. It also cut off Poonch from Pakistan by sealing the Jhelum river bridge for fear that the Pakistanis might come to aid the Poonch militias. The Army's Chief of Staff Henry Lawrence Scott also narrated an event towards the end of August, where a band of 30 Muslims from Pakistan entered Poonch and incited the Sattis and Muslim Rathores to march to the city of Poonch, demanding accession to Pakistan. (Note: Jha, The Origins of a Dispute 2003, pp. 18–19: "Gen. Scott, the commander of state forces, was at pains to point out that their main purpose was to air, local grievances, mainly the high prices of foodstuffs. The distress of the people was not surprising. As Webb had reported from Srinagar at the time, the winter of 1946–47 had been unusually severe, and had caused food shortages and pushed up prices. Add to that the disruption of supplies that had taken place in spring and summer because of the communal violence in Punjab, and it was hardly surprising that the people of Poonch, as elsewhere in Kashmir, were in considerable distress.") About 10,000 Poonchies gathered mainly to air grievances regarding high prices, and wanted to pass through the town of Bagh. The local officials at Bagh barred them from entering the town. Then the protesters surrounded the town and made attempts to attack it. Reinforcements of State troops were sent from Srinagar, which dispersed the protesters. The total casualties would not have exceeded 20 Muslim protesters, about a dozen Hindus and Sikhs and a few state troopers, according to Scott.

On the other hand, the Muslim Conference sources narrate that hundreds of people were killed in Bagh during flag hoisting around 15 August and that the Maharaja unleashed a 'reign of terror' on 24 August. Local Muslims also told Richard Symonds, a British Quaker relief worker, that the army fired on crowds, and burnt houses and villages indiscriminately. When a public meeting was held in August 1947 at Nila Bat, a village near Dhirkot, to support the demand for accession of the state to Pakistan, the Maharaja is said to have sent his forces to quell the unrest. The forces opened fire on the gathering. On 27 August, Sardar Abdul Qayuum Khan, a local zamindar (landlord), is said to have led an attack on a police-cum-military post in Dhirkot and captured it. The event then led the Maharaja to unleash the full force of his Dogra troops on the population. It is said that this created enmity between the Hindu ruler and the Muslim population. Villages were reportedly attacked and burned.

According to the Assistant British High Commissioner in northern Pakistan, H. S. Stephenson, "the Poonch affair... was greatly exaggerated". The state's army chief H. L. Scott's report on 31 August states that the army action targeted persons known or suspected of "rioting, looting, murder or inciting", but "exaggerated reports of events in Poonch circulated in these Pakistan districts in which State troops are cited as the aggressors." Scholar Srinath Raghavan states that, after the protests turned violent, the state carried out a "brutal crackdown" and the developing revolt was quickly "snuffed out".

== Politics of accession ==
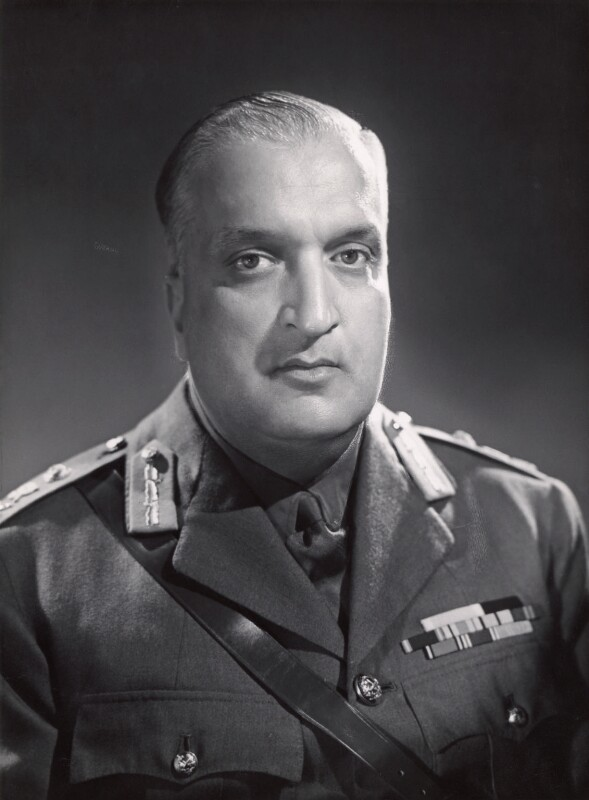
Maharaja Hari Singh of Jammu and Kashmir

With the impending independence of India and Pakistan in August 1947, the Maharaja indicated his preference to remain independent of the new dominions. All the major political groups of the state supported the Maharaja's decision, except for the Muslim Conference, which eventually declared in favour of accession to Pakistan on 19 July 1947, after its earlier hesitations. The Muslim Conference was popular in the Jammu province of the state, with especial strength in the Poonch and Mirpur districts. It was closely allied with the All-India Muslim League, which was set to inherit Pakistan.

By the time of the independence of the new dominions, it is said that, many people in Poonch were identifying themselves with Pakistan. They reportedly raised Pakistan flags and supported the Muslim Conference's pro-Pakistan stance. Several Muslim officers of the State Army had conspired to overthrow the Maharaja's government on 14 August 1947. Chief among them was Captain Mirza Hassan Khan posted at Bhimber (Mirpur district), who claimed to have been elected as the chairman of a "revolutionary council". Major General Henry Lawrence Scott, the State's Army Chief, transferred the officers to new posts prior to that date, which foiled their attempts.

Scholar Srinath Raghavan states that the "gathering head of steam" in Poonch was utilised by the local Muslim Conference led by Sardar Muhammad Ibrahim Khan to further its campaign for accession to Pakistan. (Note: Sardar Muhammad Ibrahim Khan, or Sardar Ibrahim, was the elected representative of the Poonch district in the State's Legislative Assembly and a Muslim Conference leader. According to Josef Korbel, he traveled throughout the State, arousing the spirit of the people since June 1947, and narrowly escaped arrest in Srinagar in August.)

Towards the end of August, Muslim League activists from Pakistan joined to strengthen the protests. General Scott's report on 4 September stated that 500 hostile tribesmen in green and khaki uniforms entered Poonch and they were joined by 200–300 Sattis from Kahuta and Murree. Their purpose appeared to be to loot the Hindu and Sikh minorities in the district. Scott lodged a protest with the British commander of the Pakistan's 7th Infantry Division and the Government of Kashmir also followed it up with request to Government of Pakistan to prevent the raids.

Scholar Prem Shankar Jha states that the Maharaja had decided, as early as April 1947, that he would accede to India if it was not possible to stay independent. The rebellion in Poonch possibly unnerved the Maharaja. Accordingly, on 11 August, he dismissed his pro-Pakistan Prime Minister, Ram Chandra Kak, and appointed a pro-India, retired Major Janak Singh in his place. On 25 August, he sent an invitation to Justice Mehr Chand Mahajan, with known ties to the Indian National Congress, to act as the Prime Minister. On the same day, the Muslim Conference wrote to the Pakistani Prime Minister Liaquat Ali Khan warning him that "if, God forbid, the Pakistan Government or the Muslim League do not act, Kashmir might be lost to them". The acting president Chaudhry Hamidullah sent word to the NWFP premier, Khan Abdul Qayyum Khan, to arrange for the Kashmir borders to be attacked from Pakistan to draw out State Forces, so that the Poonch rebels could advance to Srinagar.

Jha believes that the Maharaja decided to accede to India around 10 September, as reported by the Pakistan Times later that month.

== Entry of Pakistan (September 1947) ==
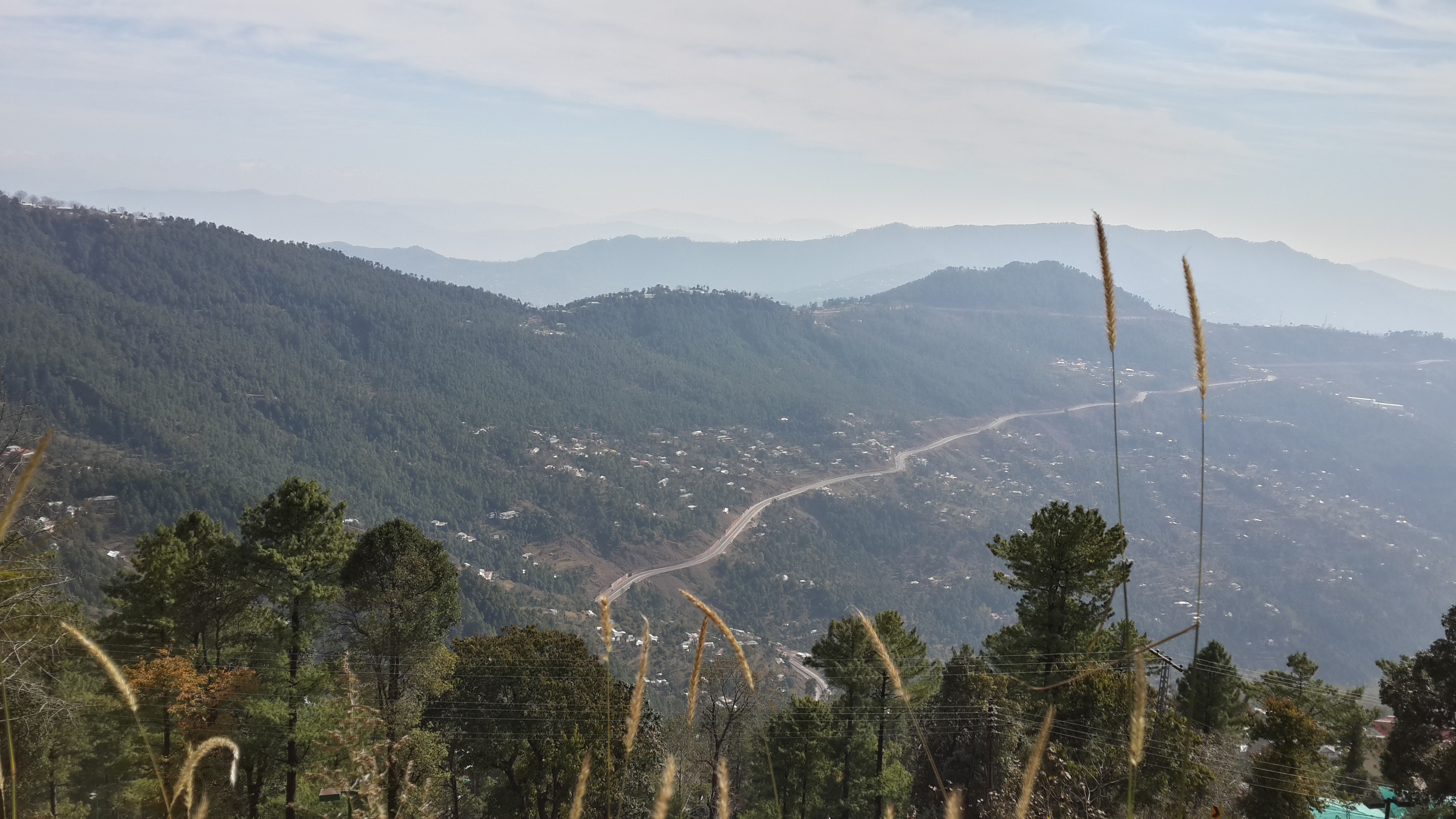
Murree, overlooking Kashmir

At the end of August, Sardar Ibrahim had escaped to West Punjab, along with dozens of rebels, and established a base in Murree across the border from Poonch in northern Punjab, which also served as a hill station for Punjab's civil and army officers. Ibrahim attracted a core group of supporters, including retired military officers and the former members of the Indian National Army (INA). From Murree, the rebels attempted to acquire arms and ammunition for the rebellion and smuggle them into Kashmir. Attempts were also made to purchase weapons from the neighbouring NWFP arms bazaars.

Before settling to work in Murree, Sardar Ibrahim went to Lahore to seek the help of Pakistan. Jinnah refused to see him, for he did not wish to be involved in the happenings of the state at that time. However, Ibrahim was able to get the attention of Mian Iftikharuddin, a Punjab politician serving as the Minister for Refugee Rehabilitation. Ibrahim told him that the Muslims of Kashmir were facing grave danger from the Maharaja's administration and they needed Pakistan's help. Iftikhar promised to make enquiries. According to other accounts, Iftikharuddin was "deputed" to go to Srinagar and explore Pakistan's prospects for Kashmir's accession.

On his way to Kashmir, Iftikharuddin stopped in Murree and met Colonel Akbar Khan, one of a handful of high-ranking Pakistani military officers, who was vacationing in the hill station. According to Akbar Khan's account, Iftikharuddin asked him to prepare a plan for action by Pakistan in case he was to find the political situation in Kashmir unpromising. He told him, however, that the action had to be "unofficial" in nature and not involve the senior British officers in the Army.

Sardar Ibrahim found his way to Akbar Khan and requested arms from the military. Ibrahim thought that "the time for peaceful negotiations was gone because every protest was being met with repressions and, therefore, in certain areas the people were virtually in a state of revolt...if they were to protect themselves and to prevent the Maharaja from handing them over to India, they needed weapons." The quantity of weapons requested was 500 rifles.

Akbar Khan discussed the issues with Ibrahim and others, and returned to Rawalpindi to develop a plan. Titled Armed Revolt inside Kashmir, his plan involved diverting to the Poonch rebels 4000 rifles which were being given by the Army to the Punjab police. Condemned ammunition, scheduled to be discarded, would be diverted to the rebels. Colonel Azam Khanzada, in charge of the Army stores, promised cooperation. The plan strategised for irregular warfare, assuming that 2000 Muslim troops of the State Army (out of a total 9000) would join the rebels. It proposed that, in addition, former officers of the Indian National Army (INA) be used to provide military leadership to the rebels. The armed action was to focus on severing the road and air links between Kashmir and India (the road link near Jammu and the airport at Srinagar). Akbar Khan made 12 copies of his plan and gave it to Mian Iftikharuddin, who returned from Kashmir with the assessment that the National Conference held strong and it did not support accession to Pakistan.

=== 12 September meeting ===
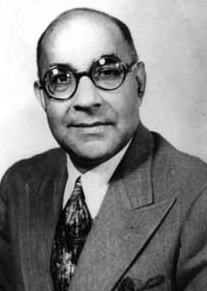
Liaquat Ali Khan, Prime Minister of Pakistan

Key locations

On 12 September, the Prime Minister of Pakistan held a meeting with Mian Iftikharuddin, Colonel Akbar Khan, West Punjab Minister Shaukat Hayat Khan and the Muslim League National Guard's chief Khurshid Anwar. The finance minister Ghulam Muhammad and other officials were also present. In addition to Akbar Khan's plan, Shaukat Hayat Khan had another plan involving the Muslim League National Guard (MLNG) and the former soldiers of the Indian National Army (INA). The Prime Minister approved both the plans, and allocated responsibilities. In the eventual shape of the action, two major forces from Pakistan were to be organised, a northern force led by Khurshid Anwar from Abbottabad, which would attack the Kashmir Valley via Muzaffarabad, and a southern force led by former INA officer Major General Zaman Kiani operating from Gujrat, which would attack Poonch and Nowshera valley. General Kiani proposed a three-tier plan: (1) preparation of armed bands in Poonch who were to advance to Srinagar, (2) organisation of a network of underground movements in the Kashmir Valley to rise at an appropriate time, and (3) harassment of the Kathua-Jammu road in order to inhibit potential aid from India. Colonel Akbar Khan too emphasised the importance of the Kathua road. General Kiani also recommended the appointment of Khawaja Abdur Rahim as the Divisional Commissioner of Rawalpindi in order to control the border districts of Jhelum, Gujrat and Rawalpindi.

Another meeting was called around 20 September, to which the Muslim Conference leaders Chaudhry Hamidullah and Muhammad Ishaque Khan were summoned from Srinagar. This meeting was also attended by Abdul Qayyum Khan, the premier of the NWFP, and Colonel Sher Khan, the Director of Military Intelligence. The Muslim Conference leaders were briefed on the invasion plans and told to communicate them to Chaudhry Ghulam Abbas, the jailed president of the Muslim Conference. Ishaque Qureshi was made part of a committee comprising himself, Faiz Ahmed Faiz, Mirza Basheer-ud-Din Mahmood Ahmad and Mian Iftikharuddin for drafting a "Declaration of Freedom".

=== GHQ Azad ===
By 23 September, General Kiani established a headquarters at Gujrat, Punjab, which came to be called 'GHQ Azad'. Brigadier Habibur Rehman served as the Chief of Staff (both were former INA officers). This command post was responsible for directing all the fighters in Poonch. Several sectoral headquarters were also established: one at Rawalpindi for supporting operations in Poonch, headed by Col. Taj Muhammad Khanzada; one at Jhelum for supporting operations in Mirpur, headed by Col. R. M. Arshad; and one at Sialkot for supporting operations in Jammu, headed by Col. Kiani. The 4000 rifles promised by Akbar Khan via Punjab Police were made available a few days later. However, the Punjab Police reportedly substituted the Army rifles for inferior Frontier-made rifles. General Kiani approached Abul A'la Maududi of Jamaat-e-Islami Pakistan, Mirza Basheer-ud-Din Mahmood Ahmad, the head of Ahamdiyyas, and other officials in Lahore for supplies, including shoes, haversacks, water bottles and other provisions.

By 2 October, Col. Kiani, in charge of the Sialkot sector, started operations south of Samba. State Forces have described these operations as "hit-and-run raids by Pakistani gangs", armed with rifles, bren guns and light automatics running 5 to 10 miles into the state. They engaged in burning of villages, looting towns, molesting and killing civilians.

=== Operation Gulmarg ===
According to Indian military sources, the Pakistani Army prepared a plan called Operation Gulmarg as early as 20 August, apparently independently of the political leadership. On that day, orders were issued via demi-official letters to various brigade headquarters in the North-West Pakistan to operationalise the plan. According to the plan, 20 lashkars (tribal militias), consisting of 1000 Pashtun tribesmen each, were to be recruited and armed at various brigade headquarters in North-West Pakistan. Ten lashkars were to be launched into the Kashmir Valley via Muzaffarabad and another ten lashkars were to join the rebels in Poonch, Bhimber and Rawalakot with a view to advance to Jammu. The plan also consisted of detailed arrangements for the military leadership and armaments. Scholar Robin James Moore states that, by 13 September, armed Pashtuns drifted into Lahore and Rawalpindi. He also adds: during September–October, there is "little doubt" that Pashtuns were involved in border raids all along the Punjab border, from the Indus to the Ravi.

The regimental records show that, by the last week of August, the Prince Albert Victor's Own Cavalry (PAVO Cavalry) regiment was briefed about the invasion plan. Colonel Sher Khan, the Director of Military Intelligence, was in charge of the briefing, along with Colonels Akbar Khan and Khanzadah. The Cavalry regiment was tasked with procuring arms and ammunition for the 'freedom fighters' and establishing three wings of the insurgent forces: the South Wing commanded by General Kiani, a Central Wing based at Rawalpindi and a North Wing based at Abbottabad. By 1 October, the Cavalry regiment completed the task of arming the insurgent forces. "Throughout the war there was no shortage of small arms, ammunitions, or explosives at any time." The regiment was also told to be on stand by for induction into fighting at an appropriate time.

== Rebellion (October 1947) ==
Muslim Conference leaders proclaimed a provisional Azad Jammu and Kashmir government in Rawalpindi on 3 October 1947. The proclamation of a similar provisional government of Junagadh in Bombay is said to have provided the impetus. (Note: According to scholar Shams Rehman, "if we accept the claims by such writers as Zahir Ud Din, it appears that indeed it was formed under the instructions of Pakistan government to oust Maharaja and take Kashmir like India took Junagarh. A closer look at the details of Junagarh case supports the claim made here that the Azad Kashmir government of 4 October that was reorganized on 24 October in fact was set up by Pakistan in reaction to the provisional government of Junagarh declared on 25 September 1947.") Khwaja Ghulam Nabi Gilkar took on the post of president under the assumed name "Mr. Anwar". Sardar Ibrahim Khan was chosen as the prime minister. (Note: Other members of the provisional government were Ghulam Haider Jandalvi, the minister for defence; Nazir Hussain Shah, the minister for finance; and two other ministers for education and industry under assumed names.) The headquarters of the government was declared to be in Muzaffarabad. However, this government quickly fizzled out with the arrest of Gilkar in Srinagar. Sardar Ibrahim continued to provide political leadership to the rebels. Thousands of rebels were organised into a people's militia dubbed the 'Azad Army'. On 24 October, the provisional government was reconstituted with Sardar Ibrahim as the President, under directions from the Rawalpindi Commissioner and Nasim Akbar Khan. (Note: Other members of this government were Sayid Ali Ahmed Shah, Chaudhri Abdullah Khan Bhalli, Khwaja Ghulam Din Wani, Sayid Nazir Husain Shah and Sonna Ullah Shah.) (Note: Sardar Ibrahim narrates that he was woken up in the dead of night on 23 October by the Divisional Commissioner of Rawalpindi, Khawaja Abdul Rahim, and told that it had become necessary to reconstitute the government with himself as the president.) Pallandri, a small town in the liberated area of the Poonch district was declared as the nominal headquarters of the provisional government. However, in practice, the 'real capital' of the new government continued to be in Rawalpindi.

On or around 6 October, the armed rebellion started in the Poonch district. The fighting elements consisted of "bands of deserters from the State Army, serving soldiers of the Pakistan Army on leave, ex-servicemen, and other volunteers who had risen spontaneously." The rebels quickly gained control of almost the entire Poonch district. The State Forces garrison at Poonch came under heavy siege.

In the Mirpur district, the border posts at Saligram and Owen Pattan on Jhelum river were captured by rebels around 8 October. Sehnsa and Throchi were abandoned by State Forces after attack.

On 21 October, the Pakistani Army's public relations officer issued a press release to the API about the impending Pashtun tribal invasion, but instructed that the news be published as coming from the Azad Kashmir headquarters at Pallandri. On the night of 21 October, Khurshid Anwar crossed into Jammu and Kashmir near Muzaffarabad, heading a lashkar of 4,000 Pashtun tribesmen. In the next few days the tribal force swelled to over 12,000 men. Facing an impending collapse, the Maharaja acceded to the Indian Union, following which India air-lifted troops to defend Srinagar on 27 October. From this point on the tribal invasion and the Poonch rebellion proceeded in parallel.

On 27 October, a Kashmir Liberation Committee was established, headed by the Pakistani Prime Minister Liaquat Ali Khan. Colonel Akbar Khan, as the military member, and Sardar Ibrahim, as the representative of Azad Kashmir were included, as were the finance officer Ghulam Mohammad and a political officer Major Yusuf. The 'GHQ Azad' of General Kiani was asked to report to this committee. In due course, Justice Din Muhammad, a retired judge of the Lahore High Court, was appointed as a "trusted agent" of the Pakistan government to liaise with the Azad Kashmir government, who also doubled as the chair of the Liberation Committee.

The PAVO Cavalry commanded by Col. "Tommy" Masud was now called into action. Under the cover of the rebellion, the regiment attacked the border town of Bhimber with armoured cars during the night of 23 October. The town, guarded by only a company of Dogra troops, supported by half-trained civilians of the Rashtriya Swayamsevak Sangh (RSS), easily succumbed. In the morning, the Azad rebels moved in and looted the town, possibly organised by INA personnel. After the fall of the fort, the PAVO Cavalry withdrew to their base and allowed the rebels to take the credit. (Note: Joshi, Kashmir, 1947–1965: A Story Retold (2008), pp. 59–: "The unit was also directly involved in capturing Bhimber. The account [of the PAVO Cavalry] makes it clear that the alleged role of locals, armed with lathis, was only a fig-leaf. The actual attack was carried out by the Pakistani regulars, led by its commanding officer Tommy Masud on 22 October night and after eliminating the lone J&K State forces company, they quietly withdrew and left the area in the hands of the ex-INA personnel.")

Rebels gained momentum after the fall of Bhimber. On 7 November, Rajouri was captured. The remaining garrisons of State Forces at Mirpur, Jhangar, Kotli and Poonch were surrounded.

== Analysis ==
Jammu political activist and journalist Ved Bhasin states that the harsh attempts of Maharaja Hari Singh and his armed forces to crush the rebellion in Poonch turned the political movement into a communal struggle.

Scholar Christopher Snedden noted that the Jammu massacres motivated some Muslims to join the movement against Maharaja, for self-defence. He also remarked:

"The reaction of the ruler's predominantly Hindu army to Poonch Muslims’ pro-Pakistan activities boosted the anti-Maharaja ‘cause’ in Poonch and incited Poonchis to take further action. In response to incidents around Poonch that invariably involved Muslims, the Maharaja's army fired on crowds, burned houses and villages indiscriminately, plundered, arrested people, and imposed local martial law. Indeed, because ‘trouble continued ... the State forces were compelled to deal with it with a heavy hand’. Until such oppressive actions, the anti-Maharaja cause probably had little backing. ‘Substantial men’ told Symonds that ‘they would never have joined such a rash enterprise’ opposing the Maharaja ‘but for the folly of the Dogras who burnt whole villages where only a single family was involved in the revolt’. Such ‘folly’ motivated some Poonch Muslims to organise a people's resistance movement."

Referring to the events in Poonch, Sheikh Abdullah, according to a New Delhi report circulated by the Associated Press of India, on 21 October said:

The present troubles in Poonch, a feudatory of Kashmir, were because of the policy adopted by the State. The people of Poonch who suffered under the local ruler, and his overlord, the Kashmir durbar, had started a people's movement to redress their grievances. It was not communal. The Kashmir State sent their troops and there was panic in Poonch. Most of the adult population in Poonch was ex-servicemen of the Indian Army, who had close connections with the people in Jhelum and Rawalpindi. They evacuated their women and children, crossed the frontier and returned with arms supplied to them by willing people. The Kashmir State forces were thus forced to withdraw from certain areas.

== Aftermath ==
Poonch district in Indian-administered Jammu and Kashmir; with Azad Kashmir territory to its left.

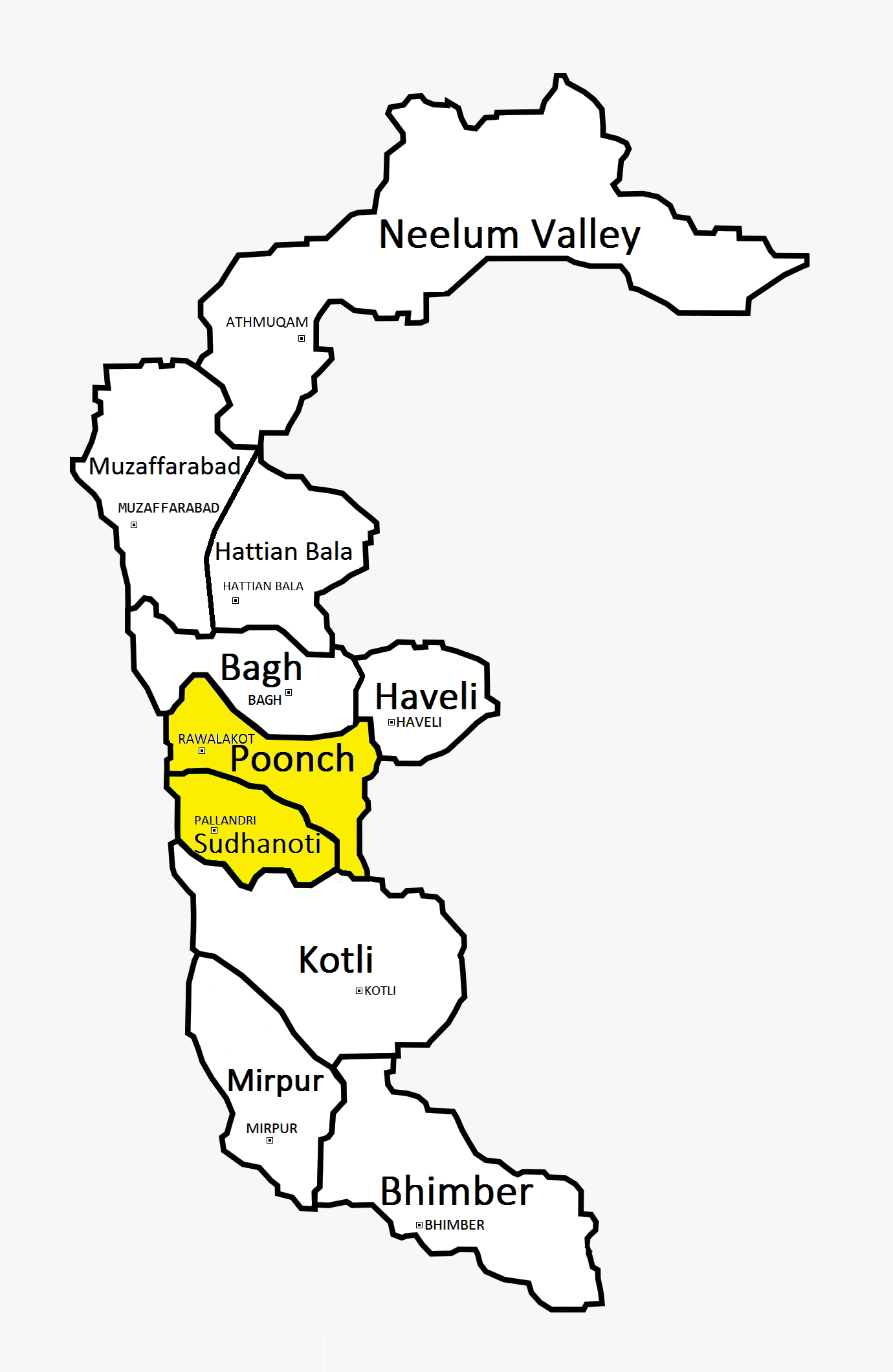
The Poonch region in Pakistan-administered Azad Kashmir is now divided into Poonch and Sudhanoti districts

After the Indian forces entered the war, Pakistan officially intervened subsequently. Fighting ensued between the Indian and Pakistani armies, with the two areas of control more or less stabilized around what is now known as the "Line of Control".

Azad Jammu and Kashmir became a self-governing administrative division of Pakistan. Poonch District of the princely state of Jammu and Kashmir was divided between India and Pakistan. The Pakistani part of Poonch District is part of its Azad Kashmir territory, whilst the Indian Poonch is part of the Jammu and Kashmir union territory.

According to scholar Ian Copland, the Jammu massacres were undertaken by the administration against the Muslims in Jammu, partly out of revenge for the Poonch uprising.

Many Hindus and Sikhs, on and after 25 November 1947 gathered in Mirpur for shelter and protection were killed by the Pakistani troops and tribesmen. "A 'greatly shocked' Sardar Ibrahim painfully confirmed that Hindus were 'disposed of' in Mirpur in November 1947, although he does not mention any figures." (Note: Ibrahim Khan, Muhammad (1990), The Kashmir Saga, Verinag, p. 55: During the month of November 1947, I went to Mirpur to see things there for myself. I visited, during the night, one Hindu refugee camp at Ali Baig—about 15 miles from Mirpur proper. Among the refugees I found some of my fellow lawyers in a pathetic condition. I saw them myself, sympathised with them and solemnly promised that they would be rescued and sent to Pakistan, from where they would eventually be sent out to India.... After a couple of days, when I visited the camp again to do my bit for them, I was greatly shocked to learn that all those people whom I had seen on the last occasion had been disposed of. I can only say that nothing in my life pained my conscience so much as did this incident.... Those who were in charge of those camps were duly dealt with but that certainly is no compensation to those whose near and dear ones were killed.) The death toll was estimated to be over 20,000.

== See also ==
- 1955 Poonch uprising
- History of Poonch District
- History of Azad Kashmir
- Jammu and Kashmir (princely state)
- Kashmir conflict
- Siege of Skardu
- Siege of Mirpur

== Bibliography ==
- Ankit, Rakesh (May 2010). "Henry Scott: The forgotten soldier of Kashmir". Epilogue. 4 (5): 44–49. Archived from the original on 10 May 2017.
- Ankit, Rakesh (August 2010), "The Problem of Poonch", Epilogue, 4 (8): 8–10
- Bhattacharya, Brigadier Samir (2013), NOTHING BUT!: Book Three: What Price Freedom, Partridge Publishing, ISBN 978-1-4828-1625-9
- Birdwood, Christopher Bromhead (1956), Two Nations and Kashmir, R. Hale
- Bose, Sumantra (2003), Kashmir: Roots of Conflict, Paths to Peace, Harvard University Press, ISBN 0-674-01173-2
- Cheema, Brig Amar (2015), The Crimson Chinar: The Kashmir Conflict: A Politico Military Perspective, Lancer Publishers, pp. 51–, ISBN 978-81-7062-301-4
- Copland, Ian (1991), "The Abdullah Factor: Kashmiri Muslims and the Crisis of 1947", in D. A. Low (ed.), Political Inheritance of Pakistan, Palgrave Macmillan UK, pp. 218–254, ISBN 978-1-349-11556-3
- Copland, Ian (2005), State, Community and Neighbourhood in Princely India, c. 1900–1950, Palgrave Macmillan, ISBN 0230005985
- Dani, Ahmad Hasan (2001), History of Northern Areas of Pakistan: Upto 2000 A.D., Sang-e-Meel Publications, ISBN 978-969-35-1231-1
- Das Gupta, Jyoti Bhusan (2012), Jammu and Kashmir, Springer, ISBN 978-94-011-9231-6
- Effendi, Col. M. Y. (2007), Punjab Cavalry: Evolution, Role, Organisation and Tactical Doctrine 11 Cavalry, Frontier Force, 1849-1971, Karachi: Oxford University Press, ISBN 978-0-19-547203-5
- Gandhi, Rajmohan (2008), Ghaffar Khan, Nonviolent Badshah of the Pakhtuns, Penguin Books India, pp. 170–171, ISBN 978-0-14-306519-7
- Jha, Prem Shankar (1996), Kashmir, 1947: Rival Versions of History, Oxford University Press, ISBN 978-0-19-563766-3
  - Jha, Prem Shankar (2003), The Origins of a Dispute: Kashmir 1947, Oxford University Press, ISBN 978-0-19-566486-7
- Government of India (1948), White Paper on Jammu & Kashmir, Government of India
- Hasan, Khalid (2013) [2007], "Mirpur 1947", in Gupta, Bal K. (ed.), Forgotten Atrocities: Memoirs of a Survivor of the 1947 Partition of India, Lulu.com, pp. 141–144, ISBN 978-1-257-91419-7
- Hiro, Dilip (2015), The Longest August: The Unflinching Rivalry Between India and Pakistan, Nation Books, ISBN 978-1-56858-503-1
- Ibrahim Khan, Muhammad (1990), The Kashmir Saga, Verinag
- Joshi, Manoj (2008), Kashmir, 1947–1965: A Story Retold, India Research Press, ISBN 978-81-87943-52-5
- McLeod, Duncan (2008), India and Pakistan: Friends, Rivals Or Enemies?, Ashgate Publishing, Ltd., pp. 39–, ISBN 978-0-7546-7437-5
- Moore, Robin James (1987), Making the new Commonwealth, Clarendon Press, ISBN 978-0-19-820112-0
- Prasad, Sri Nandan; Pal, Dharm (1987), Operations in Jammu & Kashmir, 1947-48, History Division, Ministry of Defence, Government of India
- Nawaz, Shuja (May 2008), "The First Kashmir War Revisited", India Review, 7 (2): 115–154, doi:10.1080/14736480802055455, S2CID 155030407
- Palit, D. K. (1972), Jammu and Kashmir Arms: History of the J & K Rifles, Palit & Dutt
- Raghavan, Srinath (2010), War and Peace in Modern India: A Strategic History of the Nehru Years, Palgrave Macmillan, ISBN 978-1-137-00737-7
- Saraf, Muhammad Yusuf (2015) [first published 1979 by Ferozsons], Kashmiris Fight for Freedom, Volume 2, Mirpur: National Institute Kashmir Studies
- Schofield, Victoria (2003) [First published in 2000], Kashmir in Conflict, London and New York: I. B. Taurus & Co, ISBN 1860648983
- Singh, V. K. (2005), Leadership in the Indian Army: Biographies of Twelve Soldiers, SAGE Publications, pp. 160–, ISBN 978-0-7619-3322-9
- Snedden, Christopher (2013) [first published as The Untold Story of the People of Azad Kashmir, 2012], Kashmir: The Unwritten History, HarperCollins India, ISBN 978-9350298985
- Snedden, Christopher (2015), Understanding Kashmir and Kashmiris, Oxford University Press, ISBN 978-1-84904-342-7
- Suharwardy, Abdul Haq (1983), Tragedy in Kashmir, Wajidalis
- Whitehead, Andrew (2007), A Mission in Kashmir, Penguin, ISBN 978-0-670-08127-1
- Zaheer, Hasan (1998), The Times and Trial of the Rawalpindi Conspiracy, 1951: The First Coup Attempt in Pakistan, Oxford University Press, ISBN 978-0-19-577892-2
  - Zaheer, Hasan (2007) [first published by Oxford University Press Pakistan in 1998], The Times and Trial of the Rawalpindi Conspiracy, 1951: The First Coup Attempt in Pakistan, Sang-e-Meel Publishers, ISBN 978-969-35-1992-1
- Zutshi, Chitralekha (2004), Languages of Belonging: Islam, Regional Identity, and the Making of Kashmir, C. Hurst & Co. Publishers, ISBN 978-1-85065-700-2
