= Kashmir Black Day =

Annual commemoration by Kashmiris

- Date: 27 October
- Frequency: Annual
- Country: Pakistan
- Next event: 27 October 2027

Kashmir Black Day is an annual commemoration by Kashmiris as well as by Pakistanis across the world to mark 27 October as ‘Black Day’. Every year, the day is marked to express solidarity and support Kashmiri people in their struggle for right to self-determination.

== Background ==
On 27 October 1947, the invading troops of India disembarked in Srinagar on the assertion of an Instrument of Accession purported to have been signed by the ruler Hari Singh of the princely state of Kashmir a day earlier, after virtually losing authority in the face of a popular public uprising against the autocracy.
