= This Our Paradise =

2024 novel by Karan Mujoo

- Author: Karan Mujoo
- Genre: Novel
- Publisher: Penguin Random House
- Publication date: May 2024

This Our Paradise is a 2024 novel by Karan Mujoo. It follows the lives of two Kashmiri families — one Hindu and one Muslim — as they navigate the political and social unrest in the 1990s. The two main protagonists are an unnamed eight-year-old boy and a young man named Shahid. Through their narrative were seen the rising insurgency in Kashmir and its bloody aftermath. The book was published by Penguin Random House in May 2024.

== Reception ==
Manisha Gangahar of The Tribune while reviewing the book wrote that "one of the novel's strengths lies in its ability to humanise the Kashmir conflict, providing readers with an intimate glimpse into the scars of the turmoil." Kartik Chauhan in his review for Scroll.in called the book, "a tender, heartbreaking, and ingeniously panoramic." He further wrote, "Straddling these two narratives, Mujoo deftly captures at least two Kashmirs. One of the exiled and abused Pandits, and the other of mounting militancy. In either, however, a deep sense of defeat and dislocation is registered, impressing an old, timeless truth: wars make corpses of all." Hindustan Times wrote: "In Mujoo's vivid picture of Kashmiri society, nobody is overlooked, not even the Henz or the boat people, who are at the bottom of the caste ladder. The reader is taken into a settlement of sweepers, scavengers and tanners." Anuradha Bhasin of Kashmir Times wrote, "In this poignant and thought-provoking novel, Mujoo masterfully weaves a tale of two families – Pandit and Muslim – caught in the crossfire of the Kashmir conflict, subtly dwelling on the complexities of the war and the human condition with no choice but to endure its multi-folded consequences.

Set in Kashmir of 1989-90, it is not a tale of exile told in black and white, but a story of Kashmir through an exploration of the gray areas of Kashmir’s turbulent phases in history, told with a mix of burden of history and the different hues of political ideologies and religious identities that breathed across the landscape."
