= Jammu and Kashmir Black Day =

Kashmir-related commemoration established by India in 2020

- Status: Observed
- Date: 22 October
- Frequency: Annual
- Country: India
- Next event: 22 October 2025
- Participants: Government of India, civil society, refugees
- Major events: Awareness related events, posters, banners, hoardings, panel discussion, exhibitions, publications
- Other names: Jammu and Kashmir Invasion Day

Jammu and Kashmir Black Day is an annual commemoration established in the Republic of India by the Narendra Modi-led government on 22 October 2020 with the stated aim of highlighting Pakistan's role in the 1947 Kashmir conflict, and to term it as an invasion and a "Black Day." The creation of the day has been described as a move to counter Pakistan's narrative on Kashmir.

== Description ==
=== Choice of date ===
According to Indian sources, the invasion did not start on 22 October. The first skirmish, comprising 2 JAK Infantry, took place at Owen Pattan on 8–9 October 1947. Sehnsa was attacked on 9 October, and the following days saw more skirmishes at different locations. However, 22 October is the day of observance of the invasion due to the so-called importance of the Kashmir valley, the day the Instrument of Accession was signed, and political decisions taken.

=== Commemorative events and actions ===
A number of awareness related events, including cultural event, have been held. In 2020 a number of panel discussions were held, with panelists including Lt Gen (Retd) Syed Ata Hasnain and Amitabh Mattoo. The Union Ministry of Culture and state government of Jammu and Kashmir mark the day with exhibitions and events. In 2020, Raiders in Kashmir, a book written by Mohammed Akbar Khan, a retired major general of Pakistan Army, was republished. Refugees also mark the day.

== See also ==
- Observances in Kashmir, Jammu related to the dispute
  - 19 January— Jammu and Kashmir Exodus Day
  - 5 February— Kashmir Solidarity Day
  - 16 March— Jammu and Kashmir Day
  - 13 July— Kashmir Martyrs' Day
    - A black day for some Kashmir related organizations
  - 14 September— Martyrs' Day (Oregon)
  - 22 October— Jammu and Kashmir Black Day (Invasion Day)
  - 24 October— Azad Kashmir Day
  - 26 October— Jammu and Kashmir Accession Day
  - Other black days also observed by specific groups
