= Azad Kashmir Day =

Celebrates the establishment of the Azad Kashmir government

Azad Kashmir Day یومِ تاسیس آزاد کشمیر
- Observed by: Azad Kashmir
- Date: 24 October
- Next time: 24 October 2026
- Frequency: annual

Azad Kashmir Day (Urdu: یومِ تاسیس آزاد کشمیر) is celebrated in Azad Kashmir on 24 October each year. It commemorates the date of the establishment of the state in 1947.

== See also ==
- Observances in Kashmir, Jammu related to the dispute
  - 19 January— Jammu and Kashmir Exodus Day
  - 5 February— Kashmir Solidarity Day
  - 16 March— Jammu and Kashmir Day
  - 13 July— Kashmir Martyrs' Day
    - A black day for some Kashmir related organizations
  - 14 September— Martyrs' Day (Oregon)
  - 22 October— Jammu and Kashmir Black Day (Invasion Day)
  - 24 October— Azad Kashmir Day
  - 26 October— Jammu and Kashmir Accession Day
  - Other black days also observed by specific groups
- Hurriyat and Problems before Plebiscite
- Syed Ali Shah Geelani
- 2014 Jammu and Kashmir Legislative Assembly election
