= Christopher Snedden =

Australian political scientist, analyst, academic and author

Christopher Snedden is an Australian political scientist and author. He has studied and published on the long-running Kashmir conflict between India and Pakistan. In his book, The Untold Story of the People of Azad Kashmir (2012), he proposed that the origins of the Kashmir dispute lay in the protests and eventual rebellion by the Kashmiri people of Poonch and Mirpur against Maharaja Hari Singh, and not in the subsequent invasion of Kashmir by Pashtun tribal militias from the North-West Frontier Province of Pakistan.

== Life and career ==
Christopher Snedden received B.A. in Modern Languages from the University of Canberra in 1981, focusing in Russian and Political Science. He completed a Ph.D. at La Trobe University in Melbourne in 2001, in which he explored the origins of the Kashmir dispute.

Snedden has worked for the Australian Department of Defence in its Joint Intelligence Organisation (1984–1989), Department of Foreign Affairs and Trade (1989–1990), and the Australian Transaction Reports and analysis Centre (1990–1994). From 1994 to 2002, Snedden ran his own consultancy, Asia Calling, focusing on South Asian matters.

After 2002, Snedden worked as an academic in the La Trobe University (2002-2004) and in the Centre for Defence and Strategic Studies of the Deakin University (2004-2009) as the Director of the M.A. (Strategic Studies) programme for senior military and civilian officers. Until 2019, he was a Professor specialising in South Asian studies at the Asia-Pacific Center for Security Studies in Honolulu.

== The Untold Story of the People of Azad Kashmir ==
- The Untold Story of the People of Azad Kashmir (C. Hurst & Co., 2012), ISBN 1849041504; co-published by Columbia University Press in the United States; also by HarperCollins India under the title Kashmir: The Unwritten History (2013), ISBN 978-9350298978 and ISBN 978-9350298985.
- Understanding Kashmir and Kashmiris (Oxford University Press, 2015), ISBN 978-1-84904-342-7.

Idrees Kanth of Leiden University notes the main thesis of the Untold Story as saying that the Jammuites, who later became Azad Kashmiris, had a central role in instigating the Kashmir dispute, giving a "new spin" to the Kashmir issue that makes us rethink the accepted narratives. It is not Maharaja Hari Singh's "indecisiveness" that led to the Kashmir dispute, but rather the different accessional desires of the State's peoples. Three events in the Jammu division of the State shaped these desires: first, the pro-Pakistan, anti-Maharaja uprising by the Muslim inhabitants of the Poonch jagir; second, large-scale communal violence in the eastern districts of Jammu that caused upheaval and death, including a massacre of Muslims; third, the establishment of a provisional Azad Kashmir government in areas "liberated" by the Poonch uprising. These three events, which happened well before 26 October 1947, divided the Jammu province into pro-Pakistan and pro-India areas "politically, physically and militarily."

However, Idrees Kanth finds that Snedden has oversimplified the narrative of the 'pro-India' part of the State to that of a secular attitude of Kashmiriyat. He argues that the role of the Congress party (and the National Conference allied with it) as well as the colonial state in Kashmir were also important factors.

Journalist B. G. Verghese points out that the book is entirely based on source material in Pakistan and sees the events from the point of view of Islamabad. There are no Indian or international sources or other analyses that question the Pakistani view.

Satish Kumar of the Foundation for National Security Research in New Delhi finds the new material on the Poonch uprising contains considerable detail. However, he finds the assertion of the uprising as the main cause of the Kashmir dispute to be questionable. He points out that a local uprising internal to the State by itself cannot turn a dispute into an international dispute. However, he credits Snedden for having made a "realistic assessment" that there is no possibility of Jammu and Kashmir either getting independence or being unified.

Priyanka Singh of the Institute for Defence Studies and Analyses finds the book meticulously researched providing a wealth of empirical evidence. However, she states that Snedden takes a `moderate view' on Pakistan in the first half of the book and disagrees with India's position that Pakistan incited the tribal invasion of Kashmir. These arguments she finds 'more or less in sync with conventional Western approach' of putting the onus on India for not holding a plebiscite without insisting on a Pakistani withdrawal. She says that Snedden's conclusions and recommendations come from a 'partial reading of history', perceiving it as problem of the Muslims and disregarding the issues of Jammu and Ladakh. She finds his proposed solution of 'let the people decide' disappointing as it disregards the fundamental ideological differences between India and Pakistan and the complications issuing from cross-border terrorism.
