= Kashmir Martyrs' Day =

Commemoration of a 1931 massacre

- Status: Officially inactive in India since 2019; Pakistan still observes it
- Genre: Remembrance
- Date: 13 July
- Frequency: Annually
- Inaugurated: 13 July 1931
- Founder: All India Kashmir Committee
- Most recent: December 2019
- Part of the 1931 Kashmir agitation

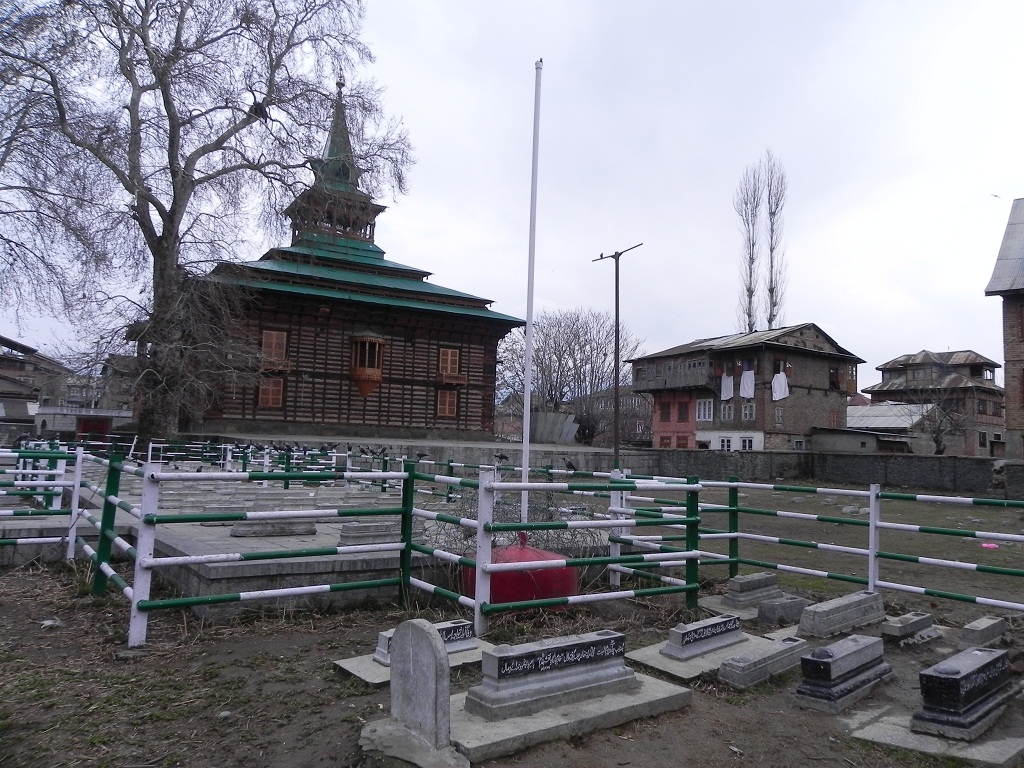
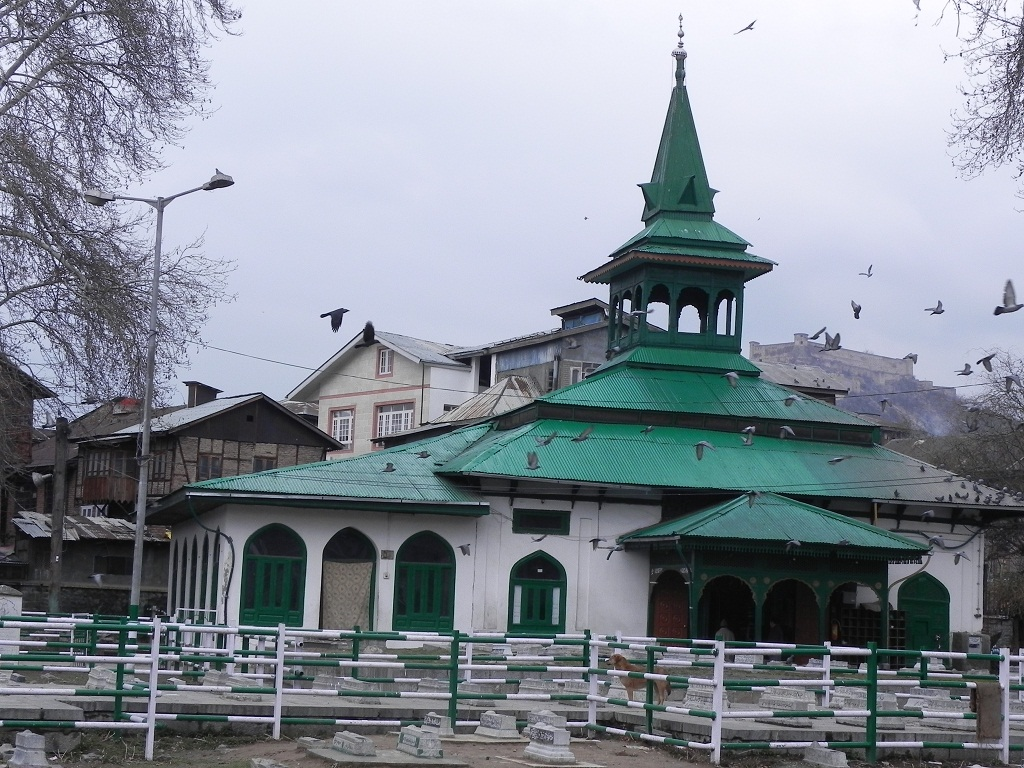
Martyrs Graveyard at Ziyarat Naqshband Sahab

Kashmir Martyrs' Day or Kashmir Day, (Note: Originally "Kashmir Day" was chosen as 14 August by a committee formed on the invitation of the head of the Ahmadiyya in Punjab Hadhrat Mirza Bashiruddin Mahmud Ahmad. The committee was the All India Kashmir Committee of which Muhammad Iqbal was a member.) was an official state holiday observed in Indian-administered Jammu and Kashmir in remembrance of 21 Muslims killed on 13 July 1931 by Dogra forces of the princely state of Jammu and Kashmir. The day was removed as an official holiday of Jammu and Kashmir by the Government of India in December 2019. However, the Government of Pakistan still marks the day.

On that day, Kashmiri Muslims were offering prayers outside the Srinagar Central Jail, where Abdul Qadeer, who had called on Kashmiris to rise against the rule of the Hari Singh. As the crowd grew restless and the Islamic call to prayer was started, the Dogra army opened fire, killing the person giving the Azan. Following this, another person continues giving the Azan, and was also killed. In total 23 were killed in attempts to finish the Azan. The crowds buried the bodies of those killed by the state forces in the graveyard attached to the Shrine of Khwaja Bahawuddin Naqshbandi (Ziyarat Naqshband Sahab) in Srinagar, which has since come to be known as Mazar-e-Shuhada or the Martyrs' Graveyard.

== Background ==
GM Lone writes in Kashmir Life that four incidents occurring in quick succession resulted in the tragedy of 13 July:

In the first case, a Hindu businessman in Udhampur had converted to Islam. His property was taken from him and given to his brother. A suit filed was dismissed with remarks that unless he re-entered the Hindu faith, he was not entitled to any property. This was done in accordance with a decree issued by the Dogra Government on 31 December 1882.

In the second case, on 29 April 1931, Muslims were stopped from continuing with Khutbah after police intervened. Following an outburst by Mir Hussain Bakhsh related to excessive interference in religious matters by the King, a protest was held at the main masjid in the city. Following this, protests against the administration became more frequent.

In the third case, on 4 June in the Central Jail Jammu, police constable Fazal Dad Khan's copy of Panjsurah (five chapters from the Quran) was thrown away in "recklessness" by a sub-inspector. Fazal Dad approached the Mosque. The fourth incident took place in Srinagar on 20 June 1931 when leaves of the Quran were found in a public lavatory.

In his work "Inside Kashmir" date 1941, Prem Nath Bazaz writes, "The driving force behind the mass agitation till the 13th July was the discontent among the rank and file of the Muslims. [...] those who laid down their lives at the jail gate did so fighting against an unsympathetic government [...].

== Abdul Qadeer ==
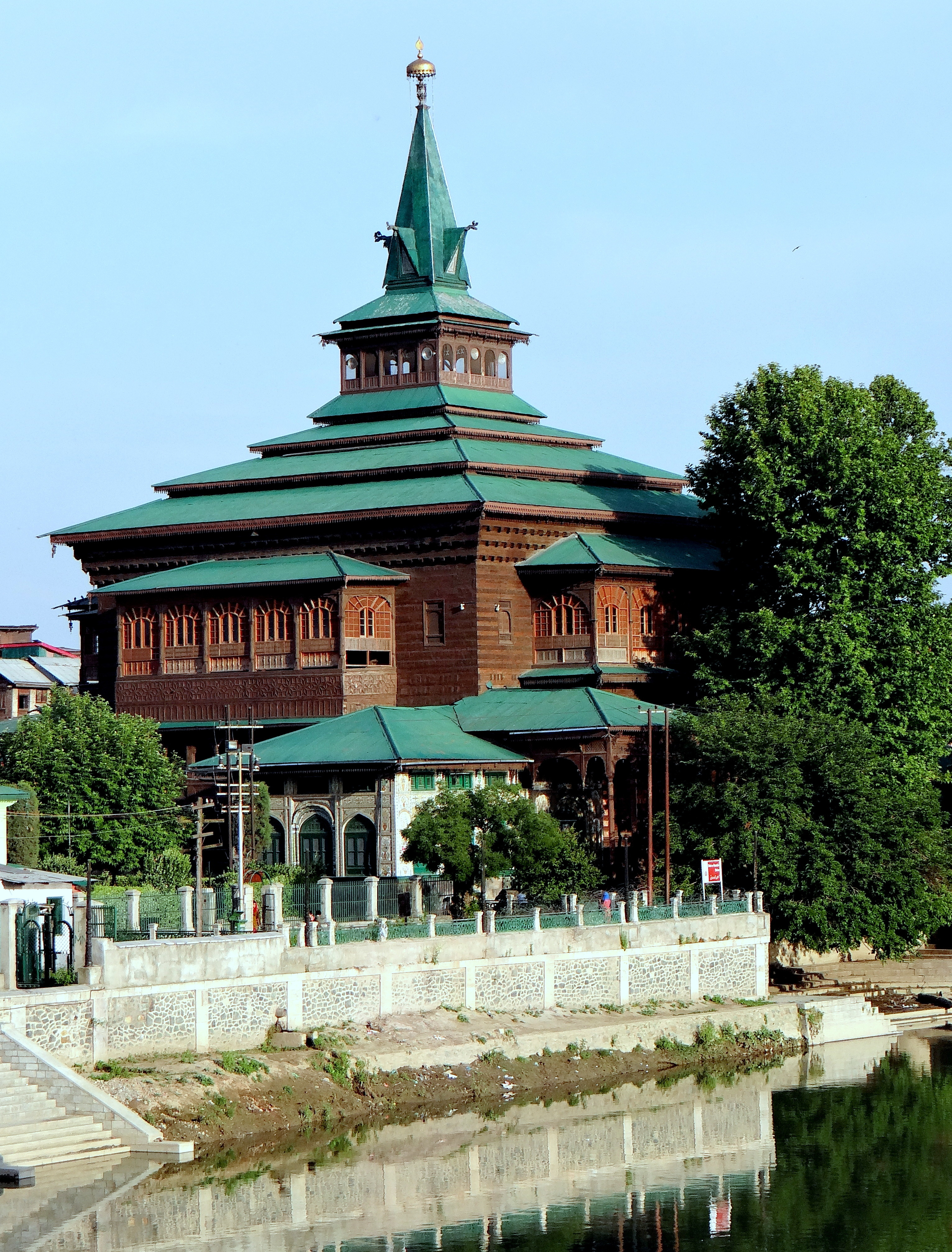
Kanqah-i-Maula, the location where Abdul Qadeer made the speech which got him arrested.

Abdul Qadeer Khan was an employee of an English army officer, Major Butt of the Yorkshire Regiment posted at Peshawar, who was taking a vacation in Kashmir. Abdul Qadeer's place of origin is uncertain. He had been attending the protest meetings and at Khanqah-i-Maula, on 21 June 1931, he was unable to suppress his feelings, which resulted in his impromptu address to the crowd.

Rashid Taseer in his "Tarikh-i-Hurriyat", recorded his speech as:

"Muslim brothers: the time has now come when we should not meet force by great force to put an end to the tyrannies and brutalities to which you are subjected, nor will they solve the issue of disrespect to Holy Quran to your satisfaction. You must rely up on your own strength and wage a relentless war against oppression"; pointing his finger towards the palace he shouted, : "raze it to the ground". He said, "We have no machine guns. But we have plenty of stones and brickbats."

His speech was recorded by the authorities and a few days later, on 25 June, he was arrested. He was charged with "sedition" and "wantonly giving provocation with intent to cause riot" under the Ranbir Penal Code. His trial started on 4 July in the Court of the Sessions Judge, Srinagar. During the four hearings on 4, 6, 7 and 9 July, a large number of Muslims gathered in the compound of the Court to witness this trial.

== 13 July 1931 ==
On 13 July 1931, Khan's trial continued in Srinagar Jail. Combining police and jail forces, there were about 160 policemen of various ranks. Out of these at least 31 were armed with guns. About 4000 to 5000 people had turned up to witness the trial. They were denied entry into the compound. However about 200 nevertheless entered and remained inside peacefully. Khan's lawyers spoke with the crowd, who agreed to return home after the noon prayer. At noon, Muslims lined up for prayers. Shortly after this, the arrival of officials including the District Magistrate and Superintendent of Police caused commotion. Slogans such as "Allah-o-Akbar- Islam Zindabad" and "Abdul Qadeer Zindabad" were shouted.

As the call to prayer began, Governor Raizada Trilok Chand ordered the armed police to open fire. Police directed their first bullets at the muezzin, who died instantly. Another muezzin attempted to finish the adhan and was also shot dead on the spot, after which police fired indiscriminately. Soon the police charged with batons and the people fought with stone, bats, and hand-to-hand fighting. In the commotion a gun was snatched by a member in the crowd, and he was in turn shot dead by a policeman. According to the evidence officially placed before the Dalal Inquiry Commission (Srinagar Riot Enquiry Committee), 180 rounds were fired. Seventeen Muslims were killed on the spot and forty received serious injuries, five of whom died later. According to The Hindu, the Daily Tribune dated 28 July 1931 reported the deaths of 21 Muslims in the firing.

GS Raghavan described 13 July 1931, in his book The Warning From Kashmir:

"The hearing in jail fell on 13th July. On that day, a mob stormed the jail and demanded admittance [...] gates had been forced and the inner gates were attacked. At the suggestion of the Judge, two Muslim lawyers, representing the accused, harangued the visitors to go out of the Jail precincts. Finding that there was no possibility of ingress, the crowd went out and started stoning officials and set fire to the police lines. The police force was then called in. All efforts to pacify the unruly mob proved futile.[...] The crowd stoned the policemen and the prisoners were liberated. [...] the District Magistrate directed fire to be opened. The crowd fell off but later it re-assembled and resumed stoning. It had to be dispersed with a Lathi charge. [...] the cavalry had to pursue it and disperse it again. [...] loot over an extensive area followed [...] pandemonium prevailed."

The crowds buried the bodies in the graveyard of the Shrine of Khwaja Bahawuddin Naqshbandi (Ziyarat Naqshband Sahab) in Srinagar, which has since come to be known as Mazar-e-Shuhada or the Martyrs' Graveyard.

== Commentary ==
Jyoti Bhusan Das Gupta, the author of "Jammu and Kashmir", wrote "[…] modern Kashmir's 'freedom movement' was born on 13 July 1931". Prem Nath Bazaz wrote "Historically and politically, 13th July 1931 was the most important day in the annals of contemporary Kashmir. From this day the struggle for independence and freedom in the most modern sense started openly". Sheikh Abdullah compared the day with the Jallianwala Bagh Massacre. Chitralekha Zutshi however emphasized the "multi-casualty of the incident" and that the incident was "an outcome of the socio economic and socio political crisis in Kashmir".

== Aftermath ==
The Reading Room Party, in protest of the killings, announced a statewide shutdown. At a public meeting at the Martyrs' Graveyard, Sheikh Abdullah announced that 13 July, henceforth, would be Martyr's Day. Amidst the following unrest, arrests included those of Sheikh Abdullah and Chaudhry Ghulam Abbas.

The aftermath of 13 July resulted in Maharaja Hari Singh appointing a commission to look into Muslim grievances chaired by B J Glancy. B J Glancy was also given the task of democratizing the monarchy. This resulted in the suggestion to set up a legislative assembly which would materialize in 1934.

== See also ==
- Observances in Kashmir, Jammu related to the dispute
  - 19 January— Jammu and Kashmir Exodus Day
  - 5 February— Kashmir Solidarity Day
  - 16 March— Jammu and Kashmir Day
  - 13 July— Kashmir Martyrs' Day
    - A black day for some Kashmir related organizations
  - 14 September— Martyrs' Day (Oregon)
  - 22 October— Jammu and Kashmir Black Day (Invasion Day)
  - 24 October— Azad Kashmir Day
  - 26 October— Jammu and Kashmir Accession Day
  - Other black days also observed by specific groups
