= Instrument of Accession (Jammu and Kashmir) =

1947 treaty incorporating the state of Jammu and Kashmir into the Dominion of India

Instrument of Accession of Jammu and Kashmir State
Instrument of Accession of Jammu and Kashmir state to the Union of India
- Type: Accession Treaty
- Signed: 26 October 1947
- Location: Srinagar/Delhi
- Effective: 27 October 1947
- Condition: Acceptance by the Governor-General of India
- Expiration: Perpetual Validity
- Signatories: (Jammu and Kashmir (princely state)) Maharaja Hari Singh (India) Lord Louis Mountbatten
- Parties: (Jammu and Kashmir (princely state)) Jammu and Kashmir; Dominion of India
- Depositary: Dominion of India
- Language: English

Full text
- Index:Instrument of Accession and Standstill Agreement of Jammu and Kashmir to Dominion of India.pdf at Wikisource

The Jammu and Kashmir Instrument of Accession is a legal document executed by Maharaja Hari Singh, ruler of the princely state of Jammu and Kashmir, on 26 October 1947.

== Parties ==
By executing an Instrument of Accession under the provisions of the Indian Independence Act 1947, Maharaja Hari Singh agreed to accede his state to the Dominion of India.

On 27 October 1947, the then Governor-General of India, Lord Mountbatten accepted the accession. In a letter sent to Maharaja Hari Singh on the same day, he said, "it is my Government's wish that as soon as law and order have been restored in Jammu and Kashmir and her soil cleared of the invader, the question of the State's accession should be settled by a reference to the people."

Pakistan governor-general Mohammad Ali Jinnah stated that the accession was "fraudulent", and that the Maharaja "betrayed" trust by acceding to India at a time when a standstill agreement signed as per his personal request to the Maharaja was still in force. (Note: The argument regarding the "standstill agreement" is based on the supposition that Islamic Republic of Pakistan had acceded to a status equivalent the former British India (see paramountcy) in relation to Jammu and Kashmir as a result of the standstill agreement, and that the Maharaja of Jammu and Kashmir had surrendered his ability to conduct the foreign policy of his kingdom. Christopher Birdwood considered it a 'wild exaggeration' of the prevailing situation. In fact, no formal standstill agreement had ever been signed; arrangements regarding post and telegraphs and train services had only been confirmed telegraphically.)

The accession to India is celebrated on Accession Day, which is held annually on 26 October.

== Text ==
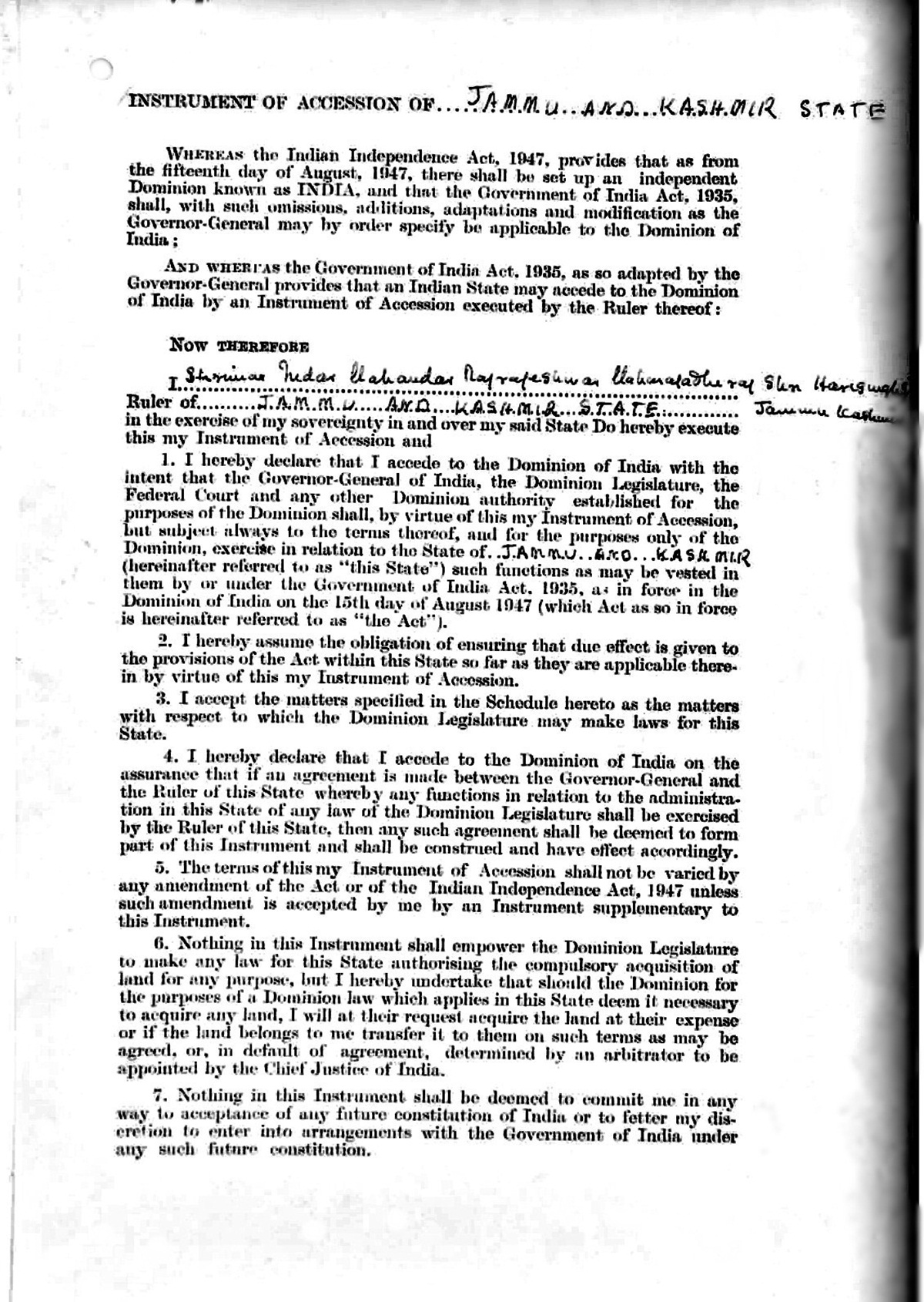
P1. Instrument of accession Kašmir

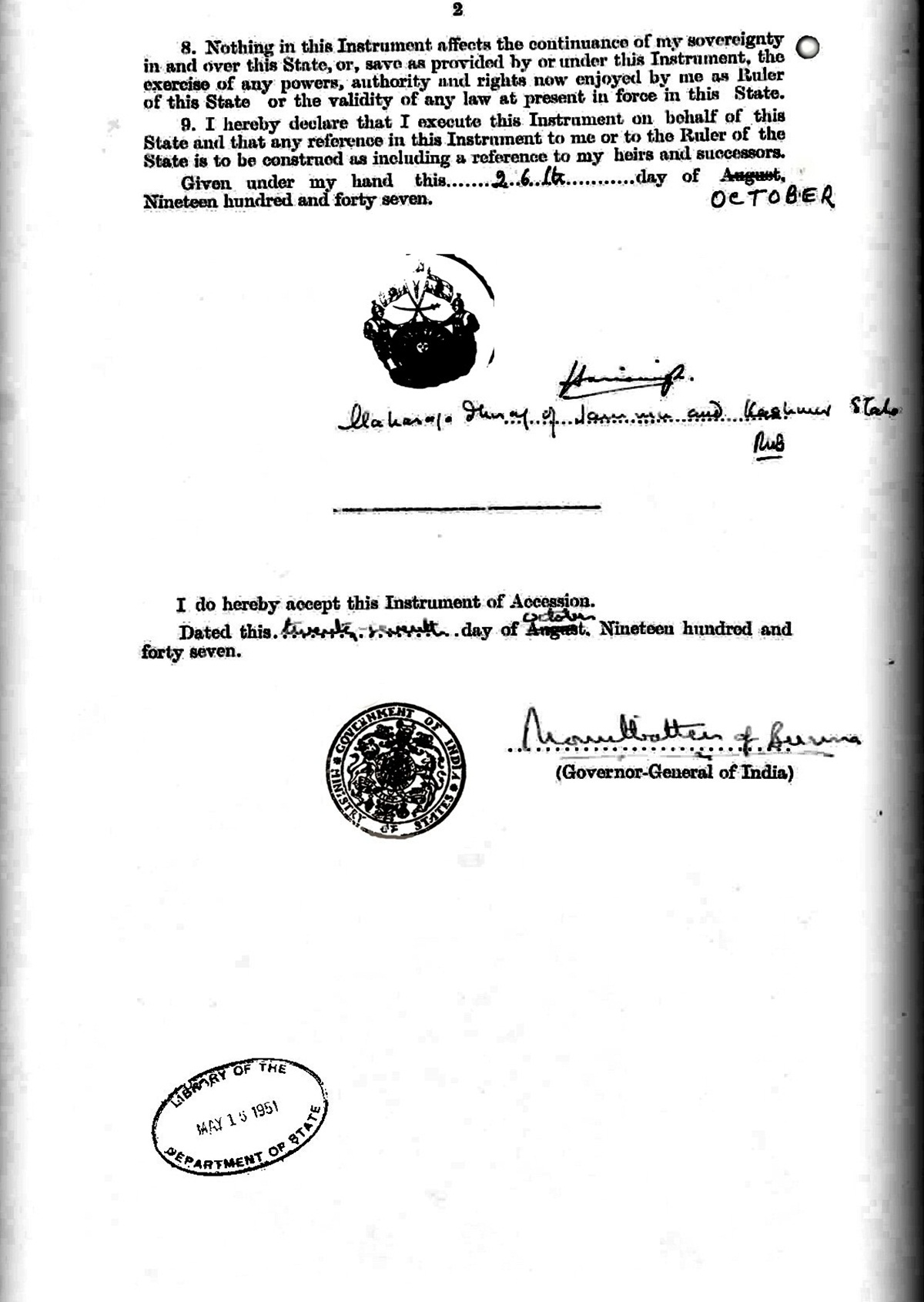
P2. Instrument of accession Kašmir

The text of the Instrument of Accession, excluding the schedule mentioned in its third point, is as follows:

Whereas the Indian Independence Act, 1947, provides that as from the fifteenth day of August, 1947, there shall be set up an independent Dominion known as INDIA, and that the Government of India Act, 1935 shall with such omissions, additions, adaptations and modifications as the Governor General may by order specify, be applicable to the Dominion of India.

And whereas the Government of India Act, 1935, as so adapted by the Governor General, provides that an Indian State may accede to the Dominion of India by an Instrument of Accession executed by the Ruler thereof.

Now, therefore, I Shriman Inder Mahinder Rajrajeswar Maharajadhiraj Shri Hari Singhji Jammu & Kashmir, Ruler of Jammu & Kashmir State, in the exercise of my Sovereignty in and over my said State do hereby execute this my Instrument of Accession and

1. I hereby declare that I accede to the Dominion of India with the intent that the Governor General of India, the Dominion Legislature, the Federal Court and any other Dominion authority established for the purposes of the Dominion shall by virtue of this my Instrument of Accession but subject always to the terms thereof, and for the purposes only of the Dominion, exercise in relation to the State of Jammu & Kashmir (hereinafter referred to as "this State") such functions as may be vested in them by or under the Government of India Act, 1935, as in force in the Dominion of India, on the 15th day of August 1947, (which Act as so in force is hereafter referred to as "the Act').
2. I hereby assume the obligation of ensuring that due effect is given to provisions of the Act within this State so far as they are applicable therein by virtue of this my Instrument of Accession.
3. I accept the matters specified in the schedule hereto as the matters with respect to which the Dominion Legislature may make law for this State.
4. I hereby declare that I accede to the Dominion of India on the assurance that if an agreement is made between the Governor General and the Ruler of this State whereby any functions in relation to the administration in this State of any law of the Dominion Legislature shall be exercised by the Ruler of the State, then any such agreement shall be construed and have effect accordingly.
5. The terms of this my Instrument of Accession shall not be varied by any amendment of the Act or the Indian Independence Act, 1947, unless such amendment is accepted by me by Instrument supplementary to this Instrument.
6. Nothing in this Instrument shall empower the Dominion Legislature to make any law for this State authorizing the compulsory acquisition of land for any purpose, but I hereby undertake that should the Dominion for the purpose of a Dominion law which applies in this State deem it necessary to acquire any land, I will at their request acquire the land at their expense, or, if the land belongs to me transfer it to them on such terms as may be agreed or, in default of agreement, determined by an arbitrator to be appointed by the Chief Justice of India.
7. Nothing in this Instrument shall be deemed to commit in any way to acceptance of any future constitution of India or to fetter my discretion to enter into agreement with the Government of India under any such future constitution.
8. Nothing in this Instrument affects the continuance of my Sovereignty in and over this State, or, save as provided by or under this Instrument, the exercise of any powers, authority and rights now enjoyed by me as Ruler of this State or the validity of any law at present in force in this State.
9. I hereby declare that I execute this Instrument on behalf of this State and that any reference in this Instrument to me or to the Ruler of the State is to be construed as including a reference to my heirs and successors.

Given under my hand this 26th day of OCTOBER, nineteen hundred and forty seven.

Hari Singh

Maharajadhiraj of Jammu and Kashmir State.

I do hereby accept this Instrument of Accession. Dated this twenty seventh day of October, nineteen hundred and forty seven.

(Mountbatten of Burma, Governor General of India).

== Schedule ==
The Schedule referred to in paragraph 3 of the Instrument of Accession reads as follows:

SCHEDULE OF INSTRUMENT OF ACCESSION THE MATTERS WITH RESPECT TO WHICH THE DOMINION LEGISLATURE MAY MAKE LAWS FOR THIS STATE

A. Defence

1. The naval, military and air forces of the Dominion and any other armed forces raised or maintained by the Dominion; any armed forces, including forces raised or maintained by an acceding State, which are attached to, or operating with, any of the armed forces of the Dominion.
2. Naval, military and air force works, administration of cantonment areas.
3. Arms, fire-arms, ammunition.
4. Explosives.

B. External Affairs

1. External affairs; the implementing of treaties and agreements with other countries; extradition, including the surrender of criminals and accused persons to parts of His Majesty's Dominions outside India.
2. Admission into, and emigration and expulsion from, India, including in relation thereto the regulation of the movements in India of persons who are not British subjects domiciled in India or subjects of any acceding State; pilgrimages to places beyond India.
3. Naturalisation.

C. Communications

1. Posts and telegraphs, including telephones, wireless, broadcasting, and other like forms of communication.
2. Federal railways; the regulation of all railways other than minor railways in respect of safety, maximum and minimum rates and fares, station and services terminal charges, interchange of traffic and the responsibility of railway administrations as carriers of goods and passengers; the regulation of minor railways in respect of safety and the responsibility of the administrations of such railways as carriers of goods and passengers.
3. Maritime shipping and navigation, including shipping and navigation on tidal waters; Admiralty jurisdiction.
4. Port quarantine.
5. Major ports, that is to say, the declaration and delimitation of such ports, and the constitution and powers of Port Authorities therein.
6. Aircraft and air navigation; the provision of aerodromes; regulation and organisation of air traffic and of aerodromes.
7. Lighthouses, including lightships, beacons and other provisions for the safety of shipping and aircraft.
8. Carriage of passengers and goods by sea or by air.
9. Extension of the powers and jurisdiction of members of the police force belonging to any unit to railway area outside that unit.

D. Ancillary

1. Election to the Dominion Legislature, subject to the provisions of the Act and of any Order made thereunder.
2. Offences against laws with respect to any of the aforesaid matters.
3. Inquiries and statistics for the purposes of any of the aforesaid matters.
4. Jurisdiction and powers of all courts with respect to any of the aforesaid matters but, except with the consent of the Ruler of the acceding State, not so as to confer any jurisdiction or powers upon any courts other than courts ordinarily exercising jurisdiction in or in relation to that State.

== Date ==
While the Instrument of Accession carries the date of 26 October, some scholars believe that it was actually signed on 27 October. However, the fact that the Governor General accepted the accession on 27 October, the day the Indian troops were airlifted into Kashmir, is generally accepted.

An Indian commentator, Prem Shankar Jha, has argued that the accession was actually signed by Hari Singh on 25 October 1947, just before he left Srinagar for Jammu.

Before taking any action on the Maharaja's request for help, the Government of India decided to send V. P. Menon, representing it, who flew to Srinagar on 25 October. On realizing the state of emergency, Menon advised the Maharaja to leave immediately for Jammu, for his own safety. He followed this advice and left Srinagar for Jammu that night, while Menon and Prime Minister Mahajan flew to Delhi early the next morning, 26 October. When they reached there, the Indian Government promised Menon and Mahajan military assistance for Jammu and Kashmir, but only after the Instrument of Accession had been signed. Hence, Menon immediately flew back to Jammu with the Instrument. The official version of events is that on his arrival, he contacted the Maharaja, who was asleep after a long journey, but who at once signed the Instrument. Menon then flew back immediately to Delhi with the legal documents on 26 October.

== Commentary ==
In 1950, a United States Department of State memorandum prepared by American diplomats George C. McGhee and John D. Hickerson, approved by Secretary of State Dean Acheson, stated on the basis of an Office of Legal Counsel opinion that the Instrument of Accession could not finalize the accession to either dominion. According to this memorandum, the Attorney General for England and Wales and Foreign Office legal advisors felt that the accession was inconsistent with Kashmir's obligations to Pakistan, and for that reason it was "perhaps invalid".

== See also ==
- Instrument of Accession
- Instrument of Accession of Junagadh
- History of Kashmir
- Jammu and Kashmir Constitution Act 1939

== References and notes ==
Notes

Citations

Bibliography

- Jha, Prem Shankar (2003), The Origins of a Dispute: Kashmir 1947, Oxford University Press, ISBN 978-0-19-566486-7
- Schaffer, Howard B. (2009). The Limits of Influence: America's Role in Kashmir. Brookings Institution Press. ISBN 978-0-8157-0370-9.
