= Jammu and Kashmir Constitution Act 1939 =

The Jammu and Kashmir Constitution Act (S. 1996, 1939 AD; Act No. XIV of S. 1996) was promulgated by Hari Singh, the Maharaja of the princely state of Jammu and Kashmir. The 78 sections detailed the kings' powers including his relationship with the executive, legislature and judiciary. Inspired by the British, a High Court was formed along with judicial advisors to the king. The law minister during this period was Justice Sir Lal Gopal Mukherjee.
