= Basian =

- Location within Pakistan
- Coordinates: 34.04°N 73.29°E
- Country: Pakistan
- Province: Khyber Pakhtunkhwa
- Elevation: 800 m (2,600 ft)
- Time zone: UTC+5 (PST)

Basian, also known as Abbasian, is a town in Abbottabad District of Khyber Pakhtunkhwa province of Pakistan, it is located at 34°04′24″N 73°29′41″E and has an average elevation of 660 metres (2168 feet). In 2005 a relief centre was set up there after the earthquake.

The population of Abbasian is 1,580.
