= Kashmir Solidarity Day =

National holiday in Pakistan

- Observed by: Pakistan
- Date: 5 February
- Next time: 5 February 2027
- Frequency: Annual
- First time: 1990
- Started by: Jamaat-e-Islami Pakistan
- Related to: Kashmir conflict

Kashmir Solidarity Day (Urdu: یوم یکجہتی کشمیر) is a national holiday observed in Pakistan on 5 February annually. It is observed to show Pakistan's support and unity with the people of Indian-administered Jammu and Kashmir and Kashmiri separatists' efforts to secede from the Indian Republic, and to pay homage to the Kashmiris who have died in the conflict. Solidarity rallies are held in the Pakistani-administered territory of Azad Jammu and Kashmir, Pakistan and by British Kashmiris in the United Kingdom.

Kashmir Solidarity Day was first proposed by Qazi Hussain Ahmad of the Jamaat-e-Islami Pakistan in 1990, and supported by Nawaz Sharif. The current commemoration was started by the Pakistani minister for Kashmir Affairs and Northern Areas in 2004.

== History ==
Kashmir Solidarity Day was first proposed by Qazi Hussain Ahmad of the Jamaat-e-Islami Pakistan in 1990. In 1991, the then-Prime Minister of Pakistan Nawaz Sharif called for a "Kashmir Solidarity Day Strike". Sharif had come to power with the help of the Jamaat in the previous year, and the 1991 event was also a Jamaat affair.

The current 'Kashmir Solidarity Day' was started by the Pakistani minister for Kashmir Affairs and Northern Areas in 2004.

In 2021, the New York State Assembly passed a resolution calling on the Governor of New York to recognize the day as Kashmir American Day. According to the resolution, the day is meant to recognize New York's Kashmiri community and to "champion human rights including the freedom of religion".

In 2022, the Pakistani franchises of international companies such as Hyundai and Kia Motors, Suzuki Motors, Toyota, KFC and Pizza Hut issued advertisements in favour of Kashmiris 'right to freedom'. The Indian franchises of these companies apologised for the partisan nature of the acts and said that their parent company's brand names were used without authorisation.

== See also ==
- Observances in Kashmir, Jammu related to the dispute
  - 19 January— Jammu and Kashmir Exodus Day
  - 5 February— Kashmir Solidarity Day
  - 16 March— Jammu and Kashmir Day
  - 13 July— Kashmir Martyrs' Day
    - A black day for some Kashmir related organizations
  - 14 September— Martyrs' Day (Oregon)
  - 22 October— Jammu and Kashmir Black Day (Invasion Day)
  - 24 October— Azad Kashmir Day
  - 26 October— Jammu and Kashmir Accession Day
  - Other black days also observed by specific groups
- All Parties Hurriyat Conference
- Human rights abuses in Jammu and Kashmir
