= Ved Bhasin =

Founder and editor of the Kashmir Times

Ved Bhasin (1 May 1929 – 5 November 2015) was a student leader, political activist and prominent journalist from Jammu. He served more than six decades in his profession of active journalism. He was the founder and editor of the Jammu and Kashmir daily Kashmir Times. He was popularly called as the 'Grand Old Man' of English journalism in the state of Jammu and Kashmir.

Ved Bhasin was known for his "uncompromising" secular views and support for the underprivileged. Over his career, Bhasin was said to have remained an advocate of justice, peace, and human rights. Credited with institutionalising journalism in Jammu and Kashmir, he was highly respected in journalistic circles for his integrity and intellectual acumen.

== Early life and activism ==
Bhasin was born on 1 May 1929 and had done his schooling in Jammu. He was a student of Prince of Wales College, Jammu. In his college days, he was more interested in politics than journalism. In 1945, his association with journalism started when he became the editor of his college magazine 'Tawi'. He did his post graduation in New Delhi.

Ved Bhasin was quite interested in the political sphere of Jammu and Kashmir. He was the President of the Jammu & Kashmir Students Union from 1945 to 1949, the President of the Jammu and Kashmir Youth National Conference from 1950 to 1953, member of the National Conference General Council from 1949 to 1953. Afterwards he left active involvement in politics and turned his attention to social and cultural matters of Jammu and Kashmir.

== Journalist career ==
Ved Bhasin had started his journalism career with Naya Samaj, an Urdu weekly from 1952-54. It was banned in 1954 under the Defence of India rules 1950, because of its opposition towards the then Jammu and Kashmir Prime Minister Sheikh Abdullah's "undemocratic" deposition and arrest. Later, Ved Bhasin founded the Kashmir Times in 1955, which started as a weekly and in 1971, it was converted into a full-fledged daily. Bhasin had also worked with news gathering agency UNI as its Jammu and Kashmir bureau chief from 1963-1969. He was the editor of the Kashmir Times from 1964 to 2000.

Bhasin was President of J&K Association of Journalists, Jammu Editors Conference, and Press Club of Jammu twice and served on various Press bodies including Press Advisory Committees (as Convener) for a number of years.

=== 1947 Jammu massacres ===
"To recall those days of communal orgy my only objective is to point out that a communalist and killer has no religion. It was the humanity that was the victim of communal fanatics. Instead of blaming any one (community) for those dark days of partition, we should better learn appropriate lessons from history and not allow the communal fanatics of one or the other community to vitiate the atmosphere and disturb communal peace and harmony."

— Ved Bhasin, talking of the violence in 1947.

Ved Bhasin was a live witness to the 1947 Jammu massacres. At his age of 17, in his home town Jammu, he witnessed the massacres in November 1947. In some way, he tried his bit in preventing what was happening.

For most of his journalistic career, Ved Bhasin did not talk about it fearing it may hurt the people whose perceptions were based on "national interest" or "propaganda." But one day in September 2003, he told his story of those days in the Jammu University at an event. Later on, his testimonies became an authoritative reportage of that pogrom.

=== Views on Kashmir crisis ===
In 2006, during the sixth international peace conference in Washington, Bhasin said that no solution for the Kashmir problem can be found without a dialogue that involves the people of Jammu and Kashmir, along with India and Pakistan. He stated that the people of the state cannot be ignored, whom he has identified as the 'primary and basic party to the Kashmir dispute'. According to Bhasin, the UN's resolution for the crisis is no longer relevant, and the only way to achieve peace is to allow all sections of people in the state to participate in the dialogue and find a solution for the majority, through a process of elimination. He says that the solution may be independence, or semi-independence, or joint control, depending upon whatever is acceptable to the consensus, though it may not be possible to satisfy everyone.

Ved Bhasin had been an opponent of the presence of security forces in the Kashmir region. He has said, "Our experience in the past is that wherever BSF was posted, the situation deteriorated." According to him, "though the region has been handed over to the security forces on the ground that there is a serious law and order problem created by the militants, the lawlessness of the security forces is adding fuel to the fire rather than quelling it".

Quoting his views from his selected works published by his daughter:

“Clearly the policy of suppression pursued in Jammu and Kashmir since 1990 has not succeeded to eliminate militancy, much less to crush popular unrest or bring back the people to the national mainstream. The bullet for bullet policy with untold human rights violations has proved counter-productive…Unless the root cause of militancy and the people’s disenchantment with India is tackled no worthwhile and lasting solution is possible. Primarily, it is a political problem which cannot be tackled with armed strength by dealing with it as simply a law and order problem. A political solution that could satisfy the urges and aspirations of the people of Jammu and Kashmir living in all regions and areas and belonging to all faiths and communities that could also be eventually acceptable to India and Pakistan is called for …J&K is not just a piece of land that it should be divided between India and Pakistan. It is the people who constitute Jammu and Kashmir…Any solution based on status-quo, geographically and politically and constitutionally, cannot be considered rational and realistic and will not be acceptable to the people who have risen in revolt.”

Bhasin opined that an independent, democratic, secular, federal and demilitarized state with internal autonomy is the ideal solution to the Kashmir problem, if both India and Pakistan agree to it and jointly guarantee the state's security.

He was criticized by many in Jammu for being pro-Kashmir valley, and was attacked several times.

== Life ==
He was married to Vimal Bhasin, who died out of cancer in 1990. The couple had two daughters, Anuradha Bhasin and Anju Bhasin. Anuradha Bhasin also pursued a career as journalist.

On 5 November 2015, Ved Bhasin died in Jammu at an age of 86. He was suffering from a degenerative brain disease for the past several months and was on life support system before his death. His death was widely condoled in the state by many people including the then Chief Minister Mufti Muhammad Sayeed, Governor Narinder Nath Vohra and all the other prominent political figures of Jammu and Kashmir.
