= Anuradha Bhasin =

Indian journalist

- Occupation: Journalist
- Known for: Kashmir region reporting

Anuradha Bhasin (also known as Anuradha Bhasin Jamwal) is an Indian journalist based in the city of Jammu. She is the executive editor of Kashmir Times, a newspaper founded by her father Ved Bhasin.

Born to Vimal and Ved Bhasin, Anuradha has worked at the Kashmir Times since 1989 when she joined the publication as a trainee reporter.

She was a fellow under the Commonwealth Scholarship and Fellowship Plan for the year of 2016, a 2023 John S Knight fellow at Stanford University, and a 2024 John S Knight Senior Journalism Fellow. She has published in peer reviewed academic journals such as the Journal of Borderlands Studies, and the Economic and Political Weekly. Bhasin is noted for being one of the first to conduct in-depth investigative reporting on the psychological aspects of people living in the Kashmir conflict region.

She was instrumental in the filing of a writ at the Supreme Court of India, which resulted in partial restoration of communication services during the 2019–2020 Jammu and Kashmir lockdown. Following the litigation, the offices of the newspaper were shut down by authorities and her housing presented with an immediate eviction notice, which according to her was vendetta from the central government. The arbitrary actions by the government against Bhasin and the Kashmir Times received widespread condemnation including from the Editor's Guild of India. She has also been severely critical of other Kashmiri newspaper editors for maintaining silence on prevalent issues in the union territory of Jammu and Kashmir and characterised their editorial standing as "Orwellian Media Policy 2020". During the 2025 India–Pakistan standoff her X (Twitter) account was one of around 2,000 accounts which were ordered to be blocked without explaining which posts violated any laws.
