= Accession Day (Jammu and Kashmir) =

State holiday in India

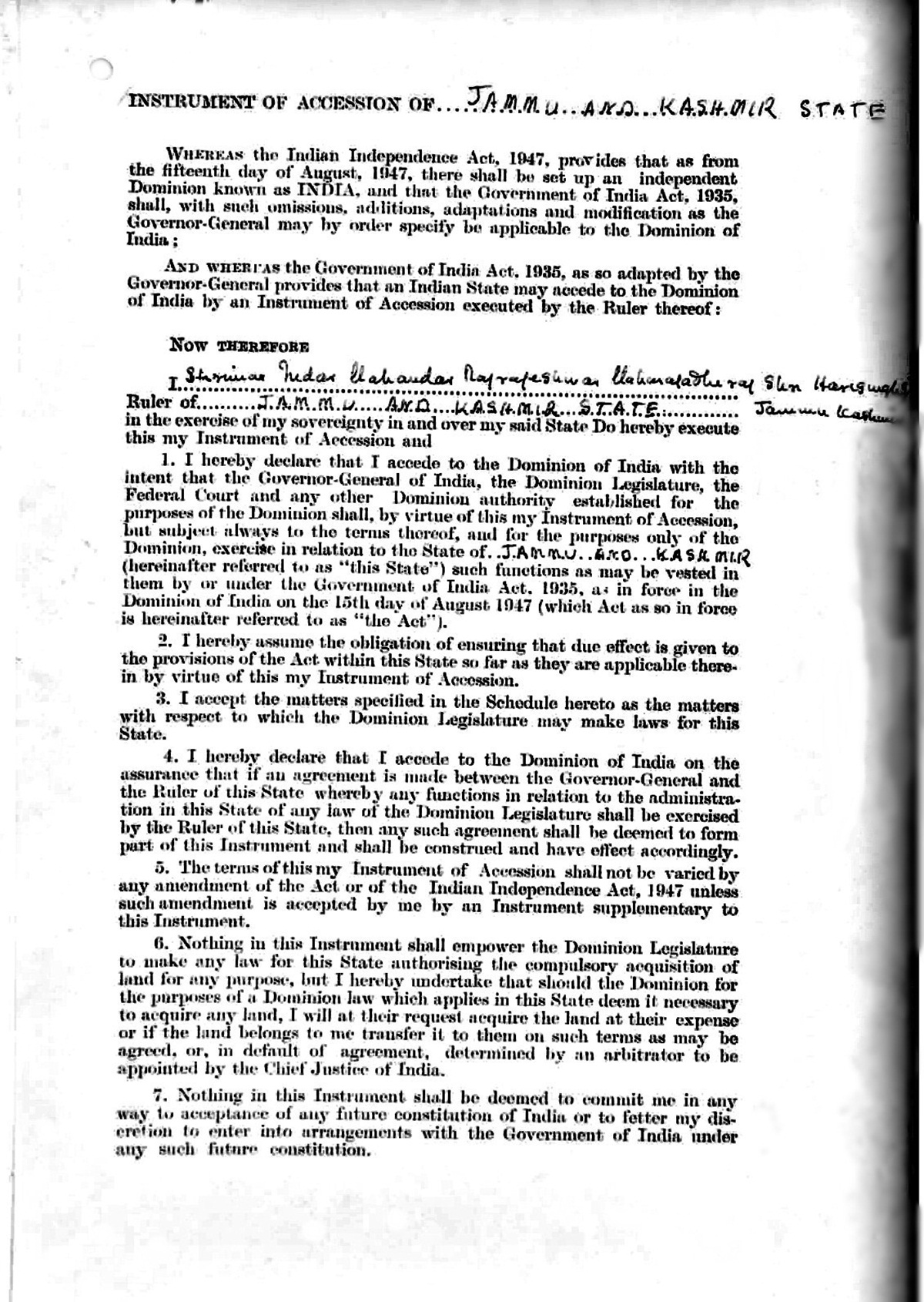
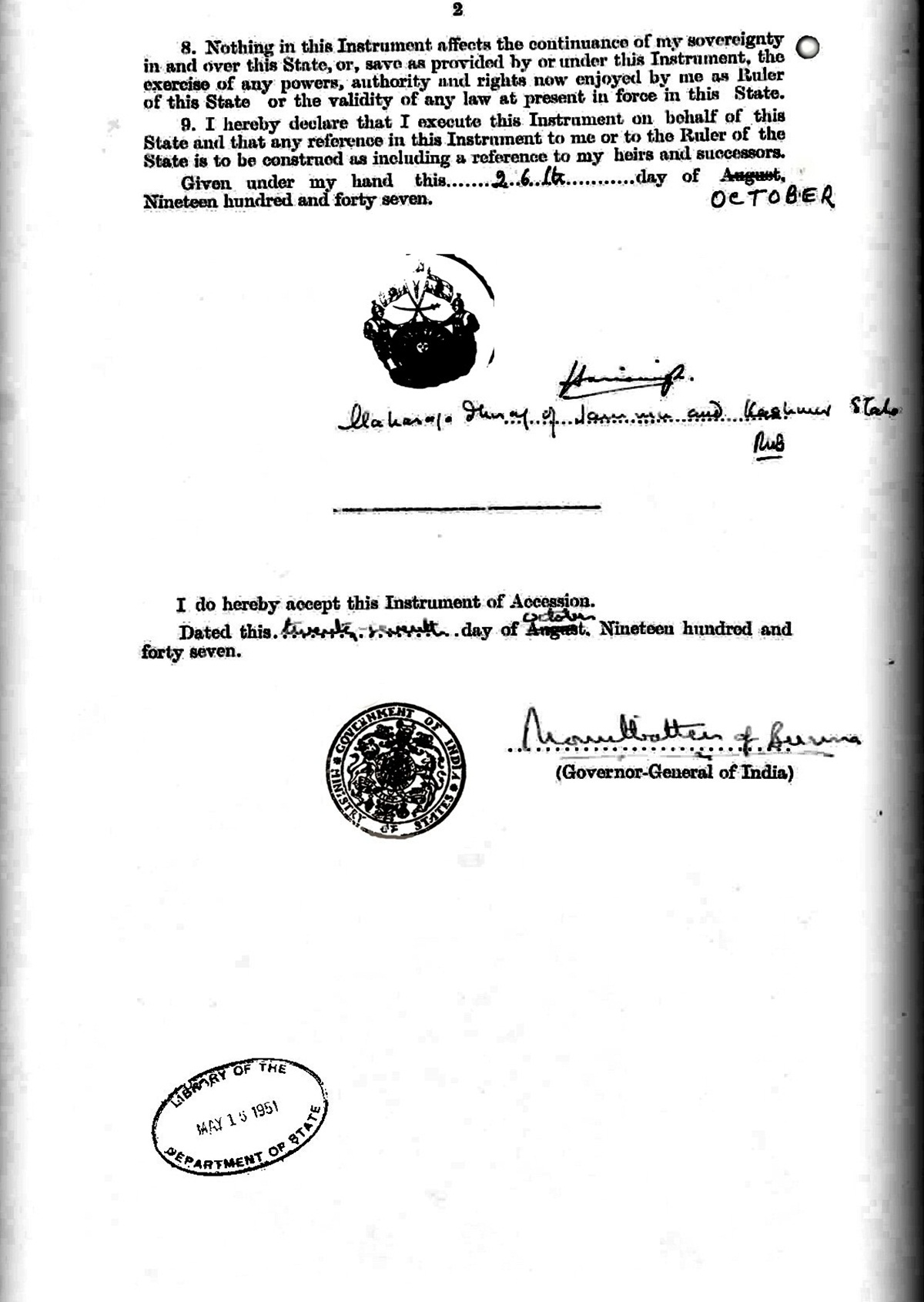
- Original text of the Instrument of Accession
- Observed by: Jammu and Kashmir, India
- Significance: Accession of the princely state of Jammu and Kashmir
- Date: 26 October
- Next time: 26 October 2026
- Frequency: Annual

Accession Day is a celebration in Jammu and Kashmir that commemorates 26 October 1947, the day when Maharaja Hari Singh signed the Instrument of Accession, by which Jammu and Kashmir acceded to the Dominion of India. While celebrated earlier, it was officially recognised as a public holiday in 2020.

The festivities of the day include holding rallies, bursting of firecrackers, singing India's national anthem, and raising the flag of India. In some areas, the festivities are as big as those of the Hindu festival of Diwali.

== Separatist perspective ==
The "Accession Day" is observed as "Black Day" by Kashmiri separatists like Syed Ali Shah Geelani and followers of All Parties Hurriyat Conference against Kashmir's accession to India. Geelani has been caught on a few occasions trying to disrupt public order due to his political motivations.

== Pakistan perspective ==
While Pakistan blames India as a belligerent actor in Kashmir, it did historically resort to use of tribal forces and proxy militants in Kashmir despite a standstill stance of Kashmir's Maharaja Hari Singh. Unilateral aggression by Pakistan became apparent prior to the conflict. Operation Gulmarg, as Pakistanis would call the invasion plan, was formulated and put into action on 20 August 1947. The designs were further attributed to a threatening letter from Pakistan to Hari Singh dated 24 August which explicitly stated that, “The time has come for Maharaja of Kashmir that he must take his choice and choose Pakistan. Should Kashmir fail to join Pakistan, the gravest possible trouble will inevitably ensue”. On 4 September 1947, General Henry Lawrence Scott, commander of the Jammu and Kashmir State forces, complained about multiple covert incursions from Pakistan and asked the Maharaja's government to raise this issue with Pakistan. On 12 September, Prime Minister of Pakistan Liaquat Ali Khan held a meeting with military and civilian officials where a go-ahead was given to two plans: raise a tribal force to attack Kashmir from the north and arm the rebels in Poonch. These actions cemented Kashmir's trajectory towards India which manifested in the signing of the accession document after which, with the permission of Kashmir's ruler, India resorted to military action to ward off hostile and invasive forces sent by Pakistan.

Pakistan views Kashmir's separation from India from the lens of the Two Nations theory and refuses to accept Maharaja Hari Singh's move to accede the territory to India. Pakistan's commitment and belief to the UN resolution on Kashmir (1948) is based on political rhetoric. Pakistan was not "sincere" in implementing the clauses of the UN resolution. Pakistan bases its argument on Clause III of the 1948 UN resolutions without concurrent reference to Clause II of the resolution. Pakistan's reluctance to withdraw its troops and tribesmen led to a situation where implementation of the UN resolution was impossible. And the failure of such implementation has led to perception among Pakistan's political elites that Kashmir was invaded despite the fact that Kashmir faced a tribal invasion from the Pakistani side on October 22, 1947.

The problem was further compounded when Pakistan "re-enacted" the 1947 tribal invasion in 1965 and has been directly involved in instigating violence in the valley since 1989. The 1999 Kargil crisis is an extension of a similar strategy. Pakistan has adopted a dual strategy in Kashmir. It applies the option of a military offensive that increasingly relies on low intensity conflict now. The low intensity conflict relies on proxy militants and political groups that further try to portray separatism as a just cause of "Kashmiris".

== See also ==
- Observances in Kashmir, Jammu related to the dispute
  - 19 January— Jammu and Kashmir Exodus Day
  - 5 February— Kashmir Solidarity Day
  - 16 March— Jammu and Kashmir Day
  - 13 July— Kashmir Martyrs' Day
    - A black day for some Kashmir related organizations
  - 14 September— Martyrs' Day (Oregon)
  - 22 October— Jammu and Kashmir Black Day (Invasion Day)
  - 24 October— Azad Kashmir Day
  - 26 October— Jammu and Kashmir Accession Day
  - Other black days also observed by specific groups
- Republic Day
- Independence Day
- Kashmir conflict
- Jammu and Kashmir Reorganisation Act, 2019
