= Henry Lawrence Scott =

Chief of Staff of the Jammu and Kashmir State Forces

Brigadier Henry Lawrence Scott

Chief of Staff of the Jammu and Kashmir State Forces
- In office 1936 – 25 September 1947
- Monarch: Hari Singh
- Succeeded by: Rajinder Singh

Personal details
- Born: 1882
- Died: 1971 (aged 88–89)
- Awards: Companion of the Order of the Bath Distinguished Service Order & Bar Military Cross

Military service
- Branch/service: Jammu and Kashmir State Forces
- Rank: Brigadier

Brigadier Henry Lawrence Scott CB DSO* MC (1882-1971) was the Chief of Staff of the Jammu and Kashmir State Forces between 1936 and 1947.

== Works ==
- The Options in 1947
