= Kashmir Life =

Indian English language magazine

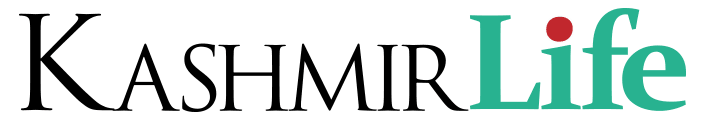
- Managing Editor: Masood Hussain
- Categories: A 24 x 7 news website that also publishes Kashmir Life, Kashmir's main weekend news magazine
- Publisher: Masood Hussain
- Founder: Jawhara Shawl
- First issue: 15 March 2009
- Country: India
- Based in: Srinagar
- Language: English
- Website: kashmirlife.net

Kashmir Life is an English-language weekly news magazine and news website published from Srinagar, Jammu and Kashmir, India. Founded by Jawhara Shawl, the publication released its first issue on 15 March 2009.It is published by Masood Hussain, who also serves as its managing editor.

== History ==
Kashmir Life was founded by late Jawahara Shawl in March 2009. The magazine is now owned by Shawl's brother-in-law, Masood Hussain. He was appointed as Managing editor of Kashmir life in April, 2017. Hussain is a veteran journalist and its Managing editor, who formerly worked with the Economic Times, which he left in 2015 after 17 years. The daily publication of Kashmir Life was halted for over 1 year after the Govt of India abrogated Article 370 in Jammu and Kashmir (state) and a complete internet shutdown was observed for over 18 months.
