= Prem Shankar Jha =

Indian economist, journalist and writer (born 1938)

- Born: 22 December 1938 (age 87); Patna, Bihar, India
- Education: The Doon School; St. Stephen's College, Delhi; University of Oxford
- Occupations: Newspaper editor, author and columnist
- Website: premshankarjha.com

Prem Shankar Jha (born 22 December 1938) is an Indian economist, journalist and writer. He has served in the United Nations Development Programme, the World Bank and as the information advisor to the Prime Minister of India. As a journalist, he held editorial positions at Hindustan Times, The Times of India, The Economic Times and The Financial Express. He is currently the managing editor of Financial World, the business daily from Tehelka and a senior journalist. Jha is the author of a dozen books including Kashmir 1947: Rival Versions of History and Crouching Dragon, Hidden Tiger: Can China and India Dominate the West?. He is also the patron of Muslim Mirror.

== Early life ==
Jha was born in Darbhanga, Bihar and attended The Doon School and St. Stephen's College, Delhi. He then went to Magdalen College, Oxford for a master's degree in philosophy, politics and economics.

== Career ==
Jha was born in Patna, India, on 22 December 1938.

In 1961, he joined the United Nations, where he spent five years in the United Nations Development Programme UNDP. He spent two of these five years in New York City as a special assistant to the managing director of the Special Fund, Paul G. Hoffman, who was the first administrator of the UNDP. The remaining three were spent in Damascus, Syria.

In 1966, Jha joined the Hindustan Times as an assistant editor. In 1969, he moved to The Times of India, where he was the deputy editor of The Economic Times. He then joined the Financial Express as its editor before moving back to The Times of India in 1981 as its economic editor. In 1986, he re-joined the Hindustan Times as its editor.

The World Bank appointed him as a consultant in 1978 to prepare a report on the public sector in India. In 1977, the Asia and Pacific Development Administration Centre of the UN in Kuala Lumpur, Malaysia gave him the project of preparing a manual for use by public sector managers for the operation and evaluation of projects.

Jha was a member of the Indian National Commission for UNESCO in 1975–1977 and in 1976 he was a delegate to the 63rd Session of the Indian Science Congress Association, Waltaire. In 1990 he served as the information advisor to the Prime Minister of India, V.P. Singh. Jha has also been a visiting professor at several institutes and universities like the Centre for International Affairs, Harvard University, Universities of Virginia and Richmond. In 1985–1987 he was also a member of the energy panel of the World Commission for Environment and Development, headed by Gro Harlem Brundtland.

He has been a columnist for The Hindu, the Hindustan Times, the Business Standard and Tehelka.

== Books ==
He is the author of the following books.

- India : A Political Economy of Stagnation (1980).
- Management of Public Enterprises in Developing Asian Countries: The UN Asian and Pacific Development Administration Centre. (1980).
- In the Eye of the Cyclone: The crisis in Indian Democracy. (1993).
- Kashmir 1947: Rival versions of History (1996).
- A Jobless Future: Political causes of Economic crisis (in India) (2002).
- The Perilous Road to the Market: The Political economy of reform in Russia, China and India. (2002).
- Kashmir 1947: the Origins of a dispute (2003).
- The End of Saddam Hussein's Iraq – History through the Eyes of the Victim (2003).
- The Twilight of the Nation State: Globalisation, Chaos, and War (2006).
- Crouching Dragon, Hidden Tiger: Can China and India Dominate the West? (2009).
- India & China: The Battle Between Soft And Hard Power (2010).
- Destruction of a Nation.

=== Kashmir 1947: Rival Versions of History ===
David Taylor, in a scholarly review of Prem Shankar Jha's Kashmir, 1947: Rival Versions of History observes that the Indian journalist who was also an information adviser to the Indian Prime Minister tackles Alastair Lamb's positions about the Mountbatten-Indian Government collaboration over Kashmir. Taylor states that while Jha does not totally rebut Lamb's positions, he provides "plausible alternative readings" to some of the arguments he had raised. Taylor also sees that Jha treats Hari Singh more sympathetically than other writers. Robert Wirsing points out that Jha's book is "laced with partisanship" and that he exaggerates the strength of his conclusions. Wirsing observes that Jha's research is not sufficient support for the sweeping claims he makes. Wirsing states that while challenging Pakistan's version of events Jha has failed to deliver a knockout punch to Pakistan.

== Awards ==
On 29 December 2021, Jha received the RedInk lifetime achievement award by the Mumbai Press Club "for his long and distinguished career of incisive and analytical writing". Chief Justice of India N. V.. Ramana presented the annual 'RedInk Awards for Excellence in Journalism.
