= Government of Azad Kashmir =

State government in Pakistani-administered Kashmir

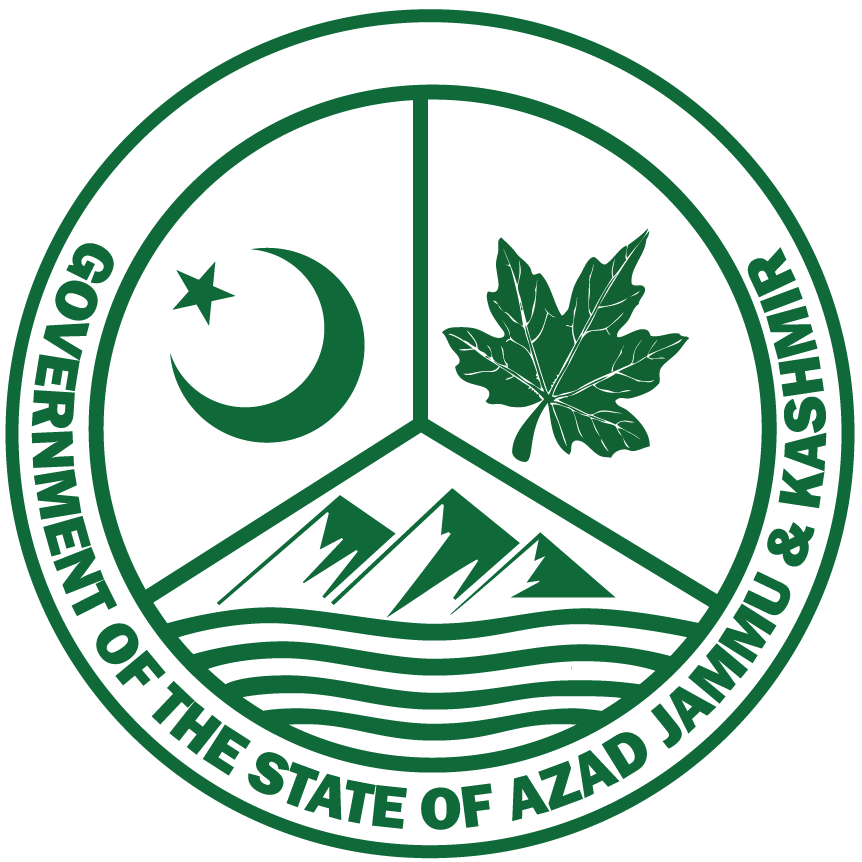

Legislative branch
- Name: Azad Jammu & Kashmir Legislative Assembly
- Presiding officer: Chaudhry Tariq Farooq, Speaker

Executive branch
- Head of state
- Title: President
- Currently: Muhammad Najeeb Naqi Khan
- Head of government
- Title: Prime Minister
- Currently: Iftikhar Gilani

Judicial branch
- Supreme Court of Azad Jammu and Kashmir
- Chief judge: Raja Saeed Akram Khan
- High Court of Azad Jammu and Kashmir
- Chief judge: Sadaqat Hussain Raja

The Government of Azad Kashmir (Urdu: حکومتِ آزاد کشمیر) is the state government which administers one of the territories of Pakistani-administered Kashmir, Azad Kashmir. The Azad Kashmir government consists of a president as head of state and a prime minister as chief executive, with the support of a council of ministers. The state assembly is the Azad Kashmir Legislative Assembly.

== Executive ==
The chief executive of the government is the prime minister, who is elected by the Azad Kashmir Legislative Assembly and is supported by a council of ministers.

=== Departments and services ===
- Auqaf and Religious Affairs Department
- AJ&K Board of Revenue
- Services & General Administration
- Election Commission
- Electricity Department
- Forestry, Wildlife & Fisheries Department
- Food Department
- Forest Department
- Finance Department
- Tourism Department
- Industries, Commerce and Labour Department
- Information and Broadcasting Department
- Information Technology Board
- Law and Parliamentary Affairs Department
- Local Government and Rural Development Department
- Police Department
- Planning & Development
- State Disaster Management Authority
- Transport Authority
- Bank of Azad Jammu and Kashmir
- Health Department
- Agriculture Department
- Elementary School and Secondary Education Department
- Ehtesab Bureau (State Accountability Bureau)
- Power Development Organization
- Higher Education Department
- AJ&K Public Service Commission
- Small Industries Department
- Public Procurement Regulatory Authority AJK
- Board of Investment (BoI) AJK
- Home and Prisons Department
- Communication and Works Department
- Mirpur Development Authority(MDA)
- Development Authority Muzzafarabad (DAM)
- Environmental Protection Agency (EPA) AJK
- AJK Emergency Services (Rescue 1122)
- Directorate of Civil Defence AJK
- Accountant General Office AJK
- Inland Revenue Services AJK
- Mineral Resources Department AJK
- Social Welfare and Women Development Department AJK
- Human Rights Department AJK
- Zakat and Ushr Department
- AJK Technical Education and Vocational Training Authority (TEVTA)
- AJK Board of Intermediate and Secondary Education, Mirpur
- Archeology Department
- Directorate General Irrigation & Small Dams
- Livestock and Dairy Development Department
- Attorney General Office AJK
- Custodian Evacuee Property Department
- Mangla Dam Housing Authority
- AJK Cooperative Societies Department
- Sports, Youth, and Culture Department

== Cabinet ==
=== Ministers ===
Name	Portfolio(s)	Party	From	Constituency
Iftikhar Gilani	Prime Minister	PML(N)	28 August 2026	Reserved seat for technocrats
Chaudhry Azhar Sadiq	Higher Education	PML(N)	4 September 2026	LA-1 Mirpur-I
Waqar Ahmed Noor	Forests, Wildlife and Fisheries	PML(N)	4 September 2026	LA-5 Bhimber-I
Umair Naeem	Elementary and Secondary Education	PML(N)	4 September 2026	LA-9 Kotli-II
Raja Muhammad Riasat Khan	Revenue and Rehabilitation	PML(N)	4 September 2026	LA-12 Kotli-V
Mir Akbar Khan	Physical Planning and Housing Bagh Development Authority	PML(N)	4 September 2026	LA-16 Bagh-III
Mustafa Bashir Abbasi	Health	PML(N)	4 September 2026	LA-30 Muzaffarabad-IV
Saqib Majeed Raja	Energy and Water Resources	PML(N)	4 September 2026	LA-31 Muzaffarabad-V
Chaudhry Abdul Rehman Arain	Tourism, Industry, Labour and Mineral Resources	PML(N)	4 September 2026	Reserved seat for overseas Kashmiris

=== Advisors ===
Name	Portfolio	Party	From

== Legislature ==
The Azad Kashmir Legislative Assembly, also known as the AJK Legislative Assembly, is a unicameral legislature of elected representatives. The assembly consists of 41 elected members and eight co-opted members of whom five are women, one is from the Ulama community, one is from Jammu and Kashmir technocrats and other professionals, and one is from Jammu and Kashmir nationals residing abroad.

== Judiciary ==
=== Supreme Court ===
The Supreme Court of Azad Jammu and Kashmir is the highest court of appeals in Azad Kashmir. It consists of a chief justice and two other judges. The number of judges in the supreme Court has been fixed at three by the Azad Kashmir Interim Constitution Act of 1974.

=== High Court ===
The high court of Azad Kashmir, which serves as the court of appeals, has three circuit benches based in Kotli, Mirpur and Rawalakot.

== VIP Aircraft ==
Aircraft	Image	Quantity	Note
Learjet 31A		1	Gifted from the Government of Balochistan.

== See also ==
- Government of Gilgit-Baltistan
- Administrative System of the Federally Administered Tribal Areas
- President of Azad Kashmir
- Prime Minister of Azad Kashmir
- Azad Jammu and Kashmir Council

Chief Election Commissioner for conducting general elections in AJK;

Service Tribunal for adjudicating service issues of civil servants;

Zakat Council for collecting, distributing the zakat system in AJK;

Supreme Judicial Council of AJK;
