= 2022 AJK local government elections =

2022 local government elections in AJK, Pakistan

- 27 November 2022

2614 seats (272 district councils + 132 Municipal corporation + 53 Town committee + 77 Municipal committee + 2080 Union council)

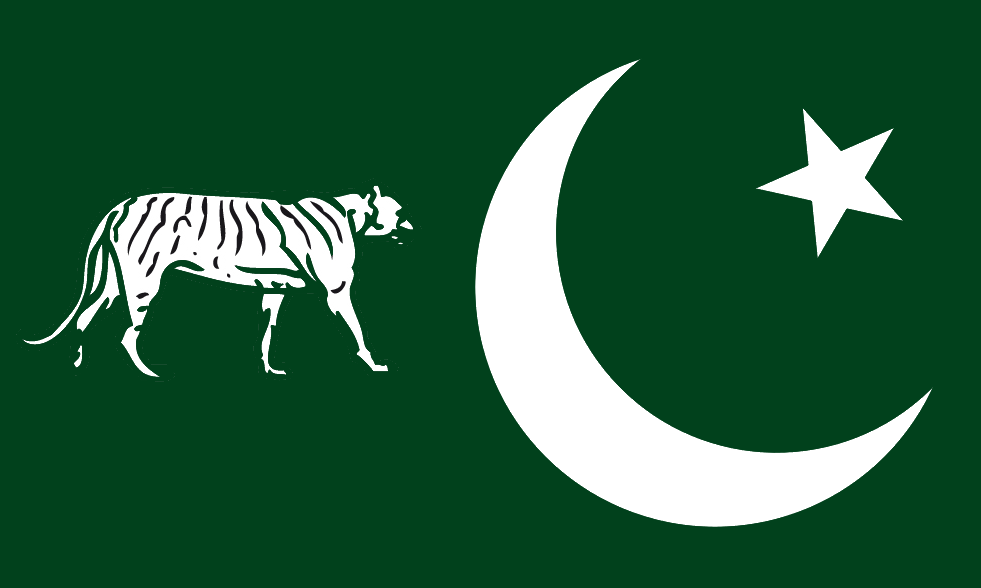

	Majority party	Minority party	Third party
Leader	Sardar Tanveer Ilyas	Shah Ghulam Qadir	Chaudhry Latif Akbar
Party	PTI	PML(N)	PPP
Leader since	18 April 2022	2 July 2022	24 March 2017
Seats won	830	497	460

Local government elections were held in Azad Jammu and Kashmir on 27 November (Muzaffarabad division), 3 December 2022 (Poonch division) and 8 December 2022 (Mirpur division) in three phases. These local government elections were the first ones in more than three decades. The results were declared for each of the three phases on their respective voting days. The elections will be held under the supervision of Election Commission of Azad Jammu and Kashmir.

In phase I elections were held in the Muzaffarabad division's three districts of Muzaffarabad, Neelum, and Jhelum Valley. Pakistan Tehreek-e-Insaf (PTI) became largest party in first phase by leading in two of the three districts followed by Pakistan People's Party (PPP) and Pakistan Muslim League (N) (PML(N)), which were the 2nd and 3rd largest parties respectively. Voting began at 8:00 am and ran until 5:00 pm without any interruption.

In phase II elections were held in the Poonch division's four districts of Poonch, Haveli, Bagh and Sudhanoti. According to results from the second round of the local government elections, the Pakistan Tehreek-e-Insaf (PTI) was in the lead with 259 seats. Following the Pakistan Muslim League-Nawaz (PML-N) with 139 seats and the Pakistan People's Party (PPP)) took third position with 125 seats. Voting began at 8:00 am and ran until 5:00 pm without any interruption.

In phase III elections were held in the Mirpur division's three districts of Mirpur, Kotli and Bhimber. According to results from the third round of the local government elections, the Pakistan Tehreek-e-Insaf (PTI) was in the lead with 374 seats. Following the Pakistan Muslim League-Nawaz (PML-N) with 231 seats and the Pakistan People's Party (PPP) took third position with 140 seats. Voting began at 8:00 am and ran until 5:00 pm without any interruption.

== Background ==
The Supreme Court of Azad Jammu and Kashmir ordered the three-phase election in the mountainous region, which is being held after at least a 31-year hiatus. Part of the reason for this is that the federal government was unable to fulfil its responsibility to provide additional security personnel. Since the previous Local government (LG) elections in AJK were held in 1991 and the subsequent polls started to be scheduled in 1995, each government has been managing the LG institutions through the use of "administrators," who can either be government employees or party members.

The subject of LG elections had been pending in the AJK's superior courts since the beginning of the previous PML-N administration. The AJK Supreme Court had ordered the government to make preparations for LG elections by August 2022 in light of the 2017 census in December of last year after protracted legal proceedings.

On the government's request, the AJK Supreme Court reviewed the deadline in July 2022 and ordered that LG elections be held by October 15, 2022. The electoral commission then set the polling date for September 28. After then, the PPP and PML-N requested yet another extension, this time until March 2023, but the Supreme Court rejected their motion and extended the deadline to November 30 instead. The phase-wise election was announced for Muzaffarabad, Poonch, and Mirpur divisions on Nov 27, Dec 3, and Dec 8, respectively, even though the commission had set Nov 27 for voting throughout AJK due to Islamabad's refusal to provide an additional 40,000 personnel.

== Elections ==
In terms of political parties, Pakistan Muslim League (N) (PML-N), Pakistan Tehreek-e-Insaf (PTI), and Pakistan Peoples Party (PPP), will likely face off against each other in the elections. The PML-N and the PPP, two opposition parties, have teamed up. The Jammu and Kashmir Peoples Party, the All Jammu and Kashmir Muslim Conference, and Jamaat-i-Islami are contesting the election on their own and aim to win a respectable number of seats.

=== Election day ===
1,323 polling places will be staffed by around 4,500 police officers, while a Quick Response Force (QRF) made up of 500 police officers will be on alert in the background to handle any emergencies. The divisional commissioners dispelled the notion that security measures were minimal by stating that the entire division had been split into 11 zones, 130 sectors, and 64 QRF points, each of which would be overseen by senior police and administration officials who had been given first-class magistrate authority.

== Seats ==
Division wise seats
Division	District council	Municipal corporation	Town committee	Municipal committee	Union council	Total
Muzaffarabad division	74	36	14	10	535	669
Poonch division	84	36	30	18	696	866
Mirpur division	116	60	9	49	849	1083
Total	272	132	53	77	2080	2618

== Candidates ==
=== Muzaffarabad division ===
Muzaffarabad division
District	District council	Union council	Town committee	Municipal committee	Municipal corporation	Total	Unopposed
Muzaffarabad	274	1078	54	21	216	1643	14
Jhelum Valley	101	422	8	13	-	544	4
Neelum	83	422	15	9	-	529	1
Total	458	1922	77	43	216	2716	19

=== Poonch division ===
Poonch division
District	District council	Union council	Town committee	Municipal committee	Municipal corporation	Total	Unopposed
Poonch	150	659	74	30	169	1082	2
Haveli	61	302	-	9	-	372	1
Bagh	225	905	26	-	93	1249	-
Sudhanoti	144	632	54	50	-	880	-
Total	580	2498	154	89	262	3583	3

=== Mirpur division ===
Mirpur division
District	District council	Union council	Town committee	Municipal committee	Municipal corporation	Total	Unopposed
Mirpur	143	510	-	135	236	1024	3
Kotli	430	1553	15	47	86	2131	16
Bhimber	214	792	29	67	-	1102	-
Total	787	2855	44	249	322	4257	19

== Polling stations ==
Polling stations
Sr. No	District	Polling station
1	Mirpur	625
2	Bhimber	535
3	Muzaffarabad	791
4	Neelam Valley	243
5	Poonch	694
6	Haveli	174
7	Bagh	558
8	Sudhanoti	436
9	Hattian	276
10	Kotli	1025
Total		5357

== Voter statistics ==
Voter stats AJK and refugees
District	Male	Female	Total	Refugees
Neelam Valley	69,475	59,823	129	-
Muzaffarabad	219,173	189,695	408,868	616
Jhelum Valley	83,545	71,229	154,774	16
Bagh	157,670	142,478	300,148	362
Haveli	54,262	47,486	101,748	-
Poonch	204,586	182,588	387,174	-
Sudhanoti	120,641	107,302	227,943	-
Kotli	305,297	263,754	569,051	1,133
Mirpur	189,177	176,801	365,978	-
Bhimber	161,076	141,944	303,020	-
Total AJK voters	1,564,902	1,383,100	2,948,002	-
Total refugees voters				2,127
Total voters			2,950,129	

== Results ==
=== Muzaffarabad division (Phase I) ===
==== Party wise results ====
Party wise results
Party	District council	Union council	Town committee	Municipal committee	Municipal corporation	Total seats won
Pakistan Tehreek-e-Insaf	32	148	5	4	8	197
Pakistan People's Party	22	159	2	5	7	195
Pakistan Muslim League (N)	11	98	5	1	12	127
AJK Muslim Conference	3	18	0	0	2	23
Jammu Kashmir Peoples Party	1	0	0	0	0	1
Jamaat-i-Islami	0	1	0	0	0	1
Tehreek-e-Labbaik Pakistan	0	1	0	0	0	1
Jamiat Ulema-e-Islam (F)	0	1	0	0	0	1
Independent	4	105	2	0	7	118
Total seats	74	535	14	10	36	669

==== Results by district council ====
District council	Seats										Ref
District council	Seats	PPP	PTI	PML (N)	AJK Muslim Conference	JK PP	Jamiat Ulema-e-Islam (F)	Jamaat-i-Islami	TLP	Independent	Ref
District council	Seats	Pakistan People's Party	Pakistan Tehreek-e-Insaf			Jammu Kashmir Peoples Party	Jamiat Ulema-e Islam				Ref
Muzaffarabad	40	16	15	3	3	1	0	0	0	2	
Jhelum Valley	TBA	TBA	TBA	TBA	TBA	TBA	TBA	TBA	TBA	TBA	
Neelum	TBA	TBA	TBA	TBA	TBA	TBA	TBA	TBA	TBA	TBA	
Total		TBA	TBA	TBA	TBA	TBA	TBA	TBA	TBA	TBA	

==== Results by Municipal corporation ====
Municipal corporation	Seats										Ref
Municipal corporation	Seats	PML (N)	PTI	PPP	AJK Muslim Conference	TLP	JK PP	Jamiat Ulema-e-Islam (F)	Jamaat-i-Islami	Independent	Ref
Municipal corporation	Seats		Pakistan Tehreek-e-Insaf	Pakistan People's Party			Jammu Kashmir Peoples Party	Jamiat Ulema-e Islam			Ref
Muzaffarabad	35	12	7	7	2	0	0	0	0	7	
Jhelum Valley	TBA	TBA	TBA	TBA	TBA	TBA	TBA	TBA	TBA	TBA	
Neelum	TBA	TBA	TBA	TBA	TBA	TBA	TBA	TBA	TBA	TBA	
Total		TBA	TBA	TBA	TBA	TBA	TBA	TBA	TBA	TBA	

=== Poonch division (Phase II) ===
==== Party wise results ====
Party wise results
Party	District council	Union council	Town committee	Municipal committee	Municipal corporation	Total seats won
Pakistan Tehreek-e-Insaf	30	200	12	6	11	259
Pakistan Muslim League (N)	23	106	3	4	3	139
Pakistan People's Party	12	100	5	2	6	125
Jammu Kashmir Peoples Party	5	15	2	0	8	30
AJK Muslim Conference	4	25	1	0	0	30
Jamaat-i-Islami	0	7	0	0	0	7
Tehreek-e-Labbaik Pakistan	0	6	0	0	0	6
Jamiat Ulema-e-Islam (F)	1	3	0	0	0	4
Independent	9	236	7	6	8	263
Total seats	84	698	30	18	36	866

==== Results by district council ====
District council	Seats										Ref
District council	Seats	PTI	PML (N)	PPP	JK PP	AJK Muslim Conference	Jamiat Ulema-e-Islam (F)	Jamaat-i-Islami	TLP	Independent	Ref
District council	Seats	Pakistan Tehreek-e-Insaf		Pakistan People's Party	Jammu Kashmir Peoples Party		Jamiat Ulema-e Islam				Ref
Bagh	28	13	3	3	0	4	0	0	0	5	
Poonch	27	6	9	6	5	0	0	0	0	1	
Sudhanoti	19	10	5	0	0	0	1	0	0	3	
Haveli	10	1	6	3	0	0	0	0	0	0	
Total	84	30	23	12	5	4	1	0	0	9	

==== Results by municipal corporation ====
Municipal corporation	Seats										Ref
Municipal corporation	Seats	PTI	PPP	JK PP	PML (N)	AJK Muslim Conference	TLP	Jamiat Ulema-e-Islam (F)	Jamaat-i-Islami	Independent	Ref
Municipal corporation	Seats	Pakistan Tehreek-e-Insaf	Pakistan People's Party	Jammu Kashmir Peoples Party				Jamiat Ulema-e Islam			Ref
Poonch	22	2	4	8	3	0	0	0	0	5	
Bagh	14	9	2	0	0	0	0	0	0	3	
Haveli	0	0	0	0	0	0	0	0	0	0	
Sudhanoti	0	0	0	0	0	0	0	0	0	0	
Total	36	11	6	8	3	0	0	0	0	8	

==== Results by union council ====
Municipal corporation	Seats										Ref
Municipal corporation	Seats	PTI	PML (N)	PPP	AJK Muslim Conference	JK PP	Jamaat-i-Islami	TLP	Jamiat Ulema-e-Islam (F)	Independent	Ref
Municipal corporation	Seats	Pakistan Tehreek-e-Insaf		Pakistan People's Party		Jammu Kashmir Peoples Party			Jamiat Ulema-e Islam		Ref
Poonch	243	65	33	32	1	15	5	5	1	86	
Bagh	204	52	15	25	23	0	2	0	0	89	
Sudhanoti	152	67	31	7	1	0	0	1	2	43	
Haveli	97	16	27	36	0	0	0	0	0	18	
Total	698	200	106	100	25	15	7	6	3	236	

==== Results by municipal committee ====
Municipal corporation	Seats										Ref
Municipal corporation	Seats	PTI	PML (N)	PPP	AJK Muslim Conference	TLP	JK PP	Jamiat Ulema-e-Islam (F)	Jamaat-i-Islami	Independent	Ref
Municipal corporation	Seats	Pakistan Tehreek-e-Insaf		Pakistan People's Party			Jammu Kashmir Peoples Party	Jamiat Ulema-e Islam			Ref
Sudhanoti	8	4	2	0	0	0	0	0	0	2	
Poonch	7	1	0	2	0	0	0	0	0	4	
Haveli	3	1	2	0	0	0	0	0	0	0	
Bagh	0	0	0	0	0	0	0	0	0	0	
Total	18	6	4	2	0	0	0	0	0	6	

==== Results by town committee ====
Municipal corporation	Seats										Ref
Municipal corporation	Seats	PTI	PPP	PML (N)	JK PP	AJK Muslim Conference	TLP	Jamiat Ulema-e-Islam (F)	Jamaat-i-Islami	Independent	Ref
Municipal corporation	Seats	Pakistan Tehreek-e-Insaf	Pakistan People's Party		Jammu Kashmir Peoples Party			Jamiat Ulema-e Islam			Ref
Poonch	16	6	4	1	2	0	0	0	0	3	
Sudhanoti	10	6	0	2	0	0	0	0	0	2	
Bagh	4	0	1	0	0	1	0	0	0	2	
Haveli	0	0	0	0	0	0	0	0	0	0	
Total	30	12	5	3	2	1	0	0	0	7	

=== Mirpur division (Phase III) ===
==== Party wise results ====
Party wise results
Party	District council	Union council	Town committee	Municipal committee	Municipal corporation	Total seats won
Pakistan Tehreek-e-Insaf	55	277	1	14	27	374
Pakistan Muslim League (N)	26	178	3	9	15	231
Pakistan People's Party	19	113	0	6	2	140
AJK Muslim Conference	0	6	1	1	0	8
Tehreek-e-Labbaik Pakistan	0	7	0	0	0	7
Jamaat-i-Islami	0	1	0	0	0	1
Jammu Kashmir Peoples Party	0	0	0	0	0	0
Jamiat Ulema-e-Islam (F)	0	0	0	0	0	0
Independent	16	261	4	19	16	316
Total seats	116	849	9	49	60	1079

==== Results by district council ====
District council	Seats										Ref
District council	Seats	PTI	PML (N)	PPP	JK PP	AJK Muslim Conference	Jamiat Ulema-e-Islam (F)	Jamaat-i-Islami	TLP	Independent	Ref
District council	Seats	Pakistan Tehreek-e-Insaf		Pakistan People's Party	Jammu Kashmir Peoples Party		Jamiat Ulema-e Islam				Ref
Mirpur	27	20	3	1	0	0	0	0	0	3	
Kotli	10	TBA	TBA	TBA	TBA	TBA	TBA	TBA	TBA	TBA	
Bhimber	27	TBA	TBA	TBA	TBA	TBA	TBA	TBA	TBA	TBA	
Total	82	TBA	TBA	TBA	TBA	TBA	TBA	TBA	TBA	TBA	

==== Results by municipal corporation ====
Municipal corporation	Seats										Ref
Municipal corporation	Seats	PTI	PPP	JK PP	PML (N)	AJK Muslim Conference	TLP	Jamiat Ulema-e-Islam (F)	Jamaat-i-Islami	Independent	Ref
Municipal corporation	Seats	Pakistan Tehreek-e-Insaf	Pakistan People's Party	Jammu Kashmir Peoples Party				Jamiat Ulema-e Islam			Ref
Mirpur	14	TBA	TBA	TBA	TBA	TBA	TBA	TBA	TBA	TBA	
Kotli	0	TBA	TBA	TBA	TBA	TBA	TBA	TBA	TBA	TBA	
Bhimber	22	TBA	TBA	TBA	TBA	TBA	TBA	TBA	TBA	TBA	
Total	36	TBA	TBA	TBA	TBA	TBA	TBA	TBA	TBA	TBA	

==== Results by union council ====
Municipal corporation	Seats										Ref
Municipal corporation	Seats	PTI	PPP	PML (N)	AJK Muslim Conference	JK PP	Jamaat-i-Islami	TLP	Jamiat Ulema-e-Islam (F)	Independent	Ref
Municipal corporation	Seats	Pakistan Tehreek-e-Insaf	Pakistan People's Party			Jammu Kashmir Peoples Party			Jamiat Ulema-e Islam		Ref
Mirpur	204	TBA	TBA	TBA	TBA	TBA	TBA	TBA	TBA	TBA	
Kotli	97	TBA	TBA	TBA	TBA	TBA	TBA	TBA	TBA	TBA	
Bhimber	243	TBA	TBA	TBA	TBA	TBA	TBA	TBA	TBA	TBA	
Total	696	TBA	TBA	TBA	TBA	TBA	TBA	TBA	TBA	TBA	

==== Results by municipal committee ====
Municipal corporation	Seats										Ref
Municipal corporation	Seats	PTI	PML (N)	PPP	AJK Muslim Conference	TLP	JK PP	Jamiat Ulema-e-Islam (F)	Jamaat-i-Islami	Independent	Ref
Municipal corporation	Seats	Pakistan Tehreek-e-Insaf		Pakistan People's Party			Jammu Kashmir Peoples Party	Jamiat Ulema-e Islam			Ref
Mirpur	0	TBA	TBA	TBA	TBA	TBA	TBA	TBA	TBA	TBA	
Kotli	3	TBA	TBA	TBA	TBA	0	TBA	TBA	TBA	TBA	
Bhimber	7	TBA	TBA	TBA	TBA	TBA	TBA	TBA	TBA	TBA	
Total	18	TBA	TBA	TBA	TBA	TBA	TBA	TBA	TBA	TBA	

==== Results by town committee ====
Municipal corporation	Seats										Ref
Municipal corporation	Seats	PTI	PPP	PML (N)	JK PP	AJK Muslim Conference	TLP	Jamiat Ulema-e-Islam (F)	Jamaat-i-Islami	Independent	Ref
Municipal corporation	Seats	Pakistan Tehreek-e-Insaf	Pakistan People's Party		Jammu Kashmir Peoples Party			Jamiat Ulema-e Islam			Ref
Mirpur	4	TBA	TBA	TBA	TBA	TBA	TBA	TBA	TBA	TBA	
Kotli	0	TBA	TBA	TBA	TBA	TBA	TBA	TBA	TBA	TBA	
Bhimber	16	TBA	TBA	TBA	TBA	TBA	TBA	TBA	TBA	TBA	
Total	30	TBA	TBA	TBA	TBA	TBA	TBA	TBA	TBA	TBA	

== See also ==
- 2021 Azad Kashmiri general election
- Azad Jammu & Kashmir Election Commission
