= Farzana Yaqoob =

Pakistani politician

- فرزانہ یعقوب

Member of the Azad Kashmir Legislative Assembly
- Incumbent
- Assumed office 24 August 2026
- Constituency: Reserved seat for women
- In office 2011 – 30 Jjuly 2016
- Constituency: LA-19 Poonch & Sudhnoti-III

Personal details
- Party: Pakistan People's Party
- Parent: Muhammad Yaqoob Khan (father)

Farzana Yaqoob (Urdu: فرزانہ یعقوب) is a Pakistani politician who has been a member of the Azad Kashmir Legislative Assembly since August 2026. She previously served as a member of the Assembly from 2011 to July 2016.

== Political career ==
Yaqoob was elected to the Azad Kashmir Legislative Assembly from LA-19 Poonch & Sudhnoti-III in a 2011 by-election as a candidate of Pakistan People's Party (PPP). The by-election was called due to the election of her father, Muhammad Yaqoob Khan, to the office of President.

On 11 January 2012, she was inducted into the cabinet of Prime Minister Chaudhry Abdul Majid as the Minister for Social Welfare and Women's Development.

She contested the 2016 Azad Kashmiri general election from LA-19 Poonch and Sudhnoti-III as a candidate of PPP, but was unsuccessful. She was defeated by Khalid Ibrahim Khan, a candidate and the leader of Jammu Kashmir Peoples Party (JKPP), by around 10,000 votes.

She was re-elected to the Assembly on a reserved seat for women in the 2026 Azad Kashmiri general election as a candidate of PPP.
