= Azad Jammu and Kashmir Council =

Government body in Pakistan

Azad Jammu and Kashmir Council / Senate of Azad Kashmir
- ایوانِ بالا / آزاد جموں و کشمیر کونسل

Agency overview
- Formed: 1974
- Jurisdiction: Government of AJK
- Headquarters: Islamabad, Pakistan
- Agency executives: Shehbaz Sharif, Chairman; Muhammad Najeeb Naqi Khan, Vice chairman
- Website: ajkcs.gov.pk

The Azad Jammu and Kashmir Council or Senate of Azad Kashmir / Upper House AJ&K Assembly (Urdu: آزاد جموں و کشمیر کونسل) is a Special Institution / Autonomous body of the Law, Justice, Parliamentary Affairs and Human Rights Department of AJ&K. This house serves as a bridge between government of Azad Jammu & Kashmir and Government of Pakistan. It was transferred to the AJ&K Government under AJ&K Interim Constitution, 1974 in 2018 via Article 51-A

The Azad Jammu and Kashmir Council is chaired by the Prime Minister of Pakistan and has a total of 14 members as per the 1974 Interim Constitution of Azad Jammu and Kashmir. As the AJK Council works under the federal government of Pakistan, it serves as a bridge between the Government of Pakistan and the Government of Azad Jammu and Kashmir.

== History ==
The Azad Jammu and Kashmir Council was constituted under the Interim Constitution of Azad Jammu and Kashmir 1974 in August 1974. Regarding the areas and subjects listed in sub-Article (3) of Article 31 of the interim constitution of AJK 1974, and the obligations placed on the Government of Pakistan by the United Nations Commission for India and Pakistan (UNCIP) resolutions, the Council shall serve as an advising body. Now the AJ&K Council is Special Institution / Autonomous body of the Law, Justice, Parliamentary Affairs and Human Rights Department of AJ&K. Transferred to the AJ&K Govt. under AJ&K Interim Constitution, 1974 in 2018 vide Article 51-A

== Organogram ==
According the AJK interim constitution, the council will be consisting of;

- Prime Minister of Pakistan.
- President of Azad Jammu and Kashmir.
- Prime Minister of Azad Jammu and Kashmir or a person nominated by him.
- Five members to be nominated by the Prime Minister of Pakistan (amongst Federal Minister, MNA, and Senators).
- Six members to be elected by the AJK Legislative Assembly (amongst state subject/domicile holders in accordance with the system of proportional representation by means of the single transferable vote).

== Qualifications ==
The qualifications of the members of the AJK council will be based on the following;

- Must be a Member of National Assembly of Pakistan or a Member of Parliament of the Senate of Pakistan.
- Must be nominated by the Prime Minister of Azad Jammu and Kashmir.
- Must be a member of the AJK Legislative Assembly or be an AJK state subject/domicile holder.

== Disqualification ==
The disqualification of the members of the AJK council will be based on the following;

- If he misses thirty consecutive council meetings without the chairman's permission.
- If he misses the opportunity to take the oath required by sub-article 6 of the interim constitution of AJK 1974, within ninety days of the election date.
- If he no longer meets the requirements to be a member under the constitution or any other legislation.

== Term ==
An elected official of the AJK council has a five-year term that begins on the day they take office, with the exception that an elected member shall, upon the conclusion of his tenure, continue in office until his replacement approaches his office.

== Current composition ==
Sr. No	Member	Took office	Left office	Time in office	Designation
1	Shehbaz Sharif	4 March 2024	Incumbent	2 years, 236 days	Chairman
2	Muhammad Najeeb Naqi Khan	24 September 2026	Incumbent	32 days	Vice chairman
3	Iftikhar Gilani	28 August 2026	Incumbent	1 year, 59 days	Member
4	Amir Muqam	11 March 2024	Incumbent	2 years, 229 days	Member
5	Chaudhry Latif Akbar	6 October 2026	Incumbent		Member
6	Chaudhry Muhammad Saeed	6 October 2026	Incumbent		Member
7	Mushtaq Ahmed Minhas	6 October 2026	Incumbent		Member
8	Chaudhry Manzoor Ahmed	6 October 2026	Incumbent		Member
9	Muhammad Hanif Malik	January 2022	Incumbent		Member
10	Sardar Muhammad Adnan Sayyab Khalid	April 2023	Incumbent		Member

== See also ==
- Ministry of Kashmir Affairs & Gilgit Baltistan
- Gilgit-Baltistan Council
- Government of Azad Kashmir
