= Elections in Azad Kashmir =

Elections in Azad Jammu and Kashmir, a region administered by Pakistan are held according to the Interim Constitution of Azad Jammu and Kashmir (Act VIII of 1974) provides for an apparently transitory autonomous parliamentary framework of self-governance and power sharing for the region of Azad Jammu and Kashmir, defined by the act as the "territories of the State of Jammu and Kashmir which have been liberated by the people of that State and for the time being under the administration of Government and such other territories as may hereafter come under its administration", however it does not pertain to areas such as Gilgit, Hunza and Baltistan. The act succeeded and re-enacted the Azad Jammu and Kashmir Government Act, 1970 with modifications. It is based on the 1973 Constitution of Pakistan.

Assembly of Azad Jammu and Kashmir is the unicameral legislature of Azad Kashmir. Azad Kashmir assembly consists of 53 Members which include 33 General Seats, 6 General seats for Refugees of Jammu and Others settled in Pakistan outside Azad Kashmir, 6 General Seats for Refugees of Kashmir Valley settled in Pakistan outside Azad Kashmir, 5 Women Seats, and 1 seat for Ulama or Mushaikh Overseas Kashmiris and Technocrats each. Election Commission of Azad Kashmir is responsible of conducting Elections in Azad Kashmir.

Because of Disputed status of Jammu and Kashmir, Azad Kashmir has no representation in Parliament of Pakistan.
