= LA-29 Muzaffarabad-III =

Constituency of the Azad Kashmir Legislative Assembly

- Constituency for the Azad Kashmir Legislative Assembly
- District: Muzaffarabad District
- Electorate: 63,594

Current constituency
- Party: Pakistan Peoples Party
- Member: Mukhtar Ahmad Khan Abbasi
- Created from: LA-29 Muzaffarabad-III

LA-29 Muzaffarabad-III is a constituency of the Azad Kashmir Legislative Assembly which is currently represented by Mukhtar Ahmad Khan Abbasi of the Pakistan Peoples Party (PPP). It covers the area of Muzaffarabad city in Muzaffarabad District.

== Election 2016 ==
General elections were held in this constituency on 21 July 2016.

General election 2016: LA-26 Muzafarabad-III
Party	Candidate	Votes	%	±%
PML(N)	Iftikhar Gilani	20,506		
PTI	Khawaja Farooq Ahmed	12,090		
PPP	Muhammad Hanif Awan	4,103		
KTI	Lutfur Rehman Nayyar	323		
KNP	Mir Afzal Sulhiria	212		
Independent	Muhammad Rafiq Khan	139		
JKPP	Muhammad Tasleem	103		
Independent	Israr Ahmad Awan	59		
Independent	Abdul Qayyum Mughal	35		
Aam Admi Party	Sardar Zahid Musadiq	33		
APML	Syed Ejaz Ul Hassan Bukhari	27		
Independent	Mazhar Ullah Chaudhary	23		
Independent	Mushtaq Ahmad Rathore	19		
MWM	Syed Arsalan Aftab Shah	11		
Turnout		37,683		

== Election 2021 ==
General elections were held on 25 July 2021.

General election 2021: LA-29 Muzafarabad-III
Party	Candidate	Votes	%	±%
PTI	Khawaja Farooq Ahmed	13,337	30.83	
PML(N)	Iftikhar Gilani	10,557	24.40	
Independent	Sardar Mukhtar Khan	10,323	23.86	
PPP	Sardar Mubarak Haider	6,436	14.88	
Others	Others (twenty-two candidates)	2,610	6.03	
Turnout		43,263	68.03	
Majority		2,780	6.43	
Registered electors		63,594		
PTI gain from PML(N)				
