= Member of the Provincial Assembly =

Representative of the Pakistani people in the provincial assembly

- Emblem of Pakistan
- Flag of Pakistan
- Status: Active
- Abbreviation: MPA
- Member of: Provincial Assembly
- Reports to: Speaker of the Provincial Assembly
- Seat: Provincial Assembly
- Term length: 5 years; renewable

A Member of the Provincial Assembly, or MPA is a representative elected by the voters of an electoral district to the legislature or legislative assembly of a subnational jurisdiction. In Pakistan, the MPAs are elected by the voters in provinces for a term of five years.

== Eligibility criteria ==
The following requirements must be met in order for someone to be eligible to run for the Provincial Assembly of Pakistan;

- Must be a Pakistani national.
- At least 25 years old.
- Not be found guilty by the jury.
- Sufficient understanding of Islamic beliefs.
- Must be a moral individual.
- Must be ameen and sadiq.
- Must be registered to vote in a Pakistani provincial constituency.

== Disqualification grounds ==
A person wouldn't be eligible to represent Pakistan in the Provincial Assembly if he;

- Has a bad mental health.
- Is bankrupt.
- Has lost his or her citizenship in Pakistan.
- Is therefore ineligible under any law passed by the Pakistani parliament.
- Is therefore disqualified due to desertion.
- Has, among other things, been found guilty of inciting animosity amongst various groups.
- Has been found guilty of the crime of bribery.
- Has received a conviction for a crime and a prison term of more than two years.
- Has been fired due to corruption or state disloyalty (in the case of a government servant).

== Term ==
The member of provincial assembly have a five-year term starting on the day of their first meeting. All four provincial assemblies begin their five-year tenure at roughly the same time because general elections for all of them are held on the same day. This enables elections for all of the assemblies to be held on a single day and assists the governments in deciding to dissolve the assemblies on a single day after five years.

== Responsibilities ==
Members of Pakistan's provincial assembly have the following duties:

- Legislative: Making the appropriate laws through legislation.
- Oversight: Ensuring that the executive's responsibilities are being met.
- Representation: To speak in the provincial assembly on behalf of the views and preferences of their constituency.
- Power of the purse: The ability to control and approve planned government budgetary receipts and expenditures.

== Seat allocation ==
According to the Constitution of Pakistan, the number of seats in each provincial assembly is determined by the population of the corresponding province. Women and non-Muslims have reserved seats in addition to the general seating.

No	Description	Balochistan	Khyber Pakhtunkhwa	Punjab	Sindh
1	General seats	51	115	297	130
2	Women	11	26	66	29
3	Non-Muslims	3	4	8	9
4	Total	65	145	371	168

== Provincial Assemblies in Pakistan ==
- Provincial Assembly of Balochistan
- Provincial Assembly of Sindh
- Provincial Assembly of Khyber-Pakhtunkhwa
- Provincial Assembly of the Punjab
- Provincial Assembly of Gilgit Baltistan
- Provincial Assembly of Azad Jammu and Kashmir
- Provincial Assembly of East Pakistan (now dissolved)

== See also ==
- Member of the National Assembly of Pakistan
- Member of Parliament, Senate of Pakistan
