= Interim Constitution of Azad Jammu and Kashmir =

Act to provide for a provisional constitution to Azad Kashmir

Azad Jammu and Kashmir Interim Constitution, 1974
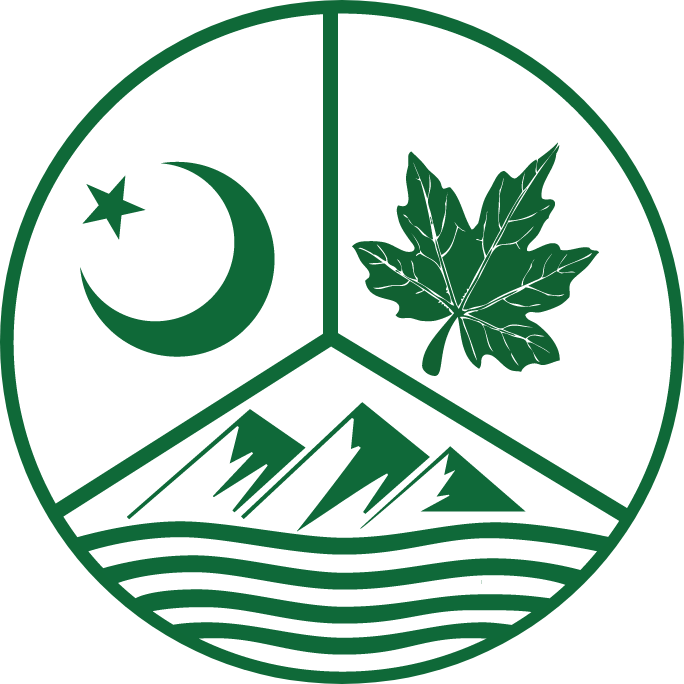

Overview
- Jurisdiction: Azad Jammu and Kashmir
- Created: 1974
- System: Parliamentary democracy with an elected legislature, republic

History
- Amendments: 14
- Citation: Azad Jammu and Kashmir Interim Constitution Act (VIII of 1974) (PDF), 31 August 1974, archived from the original (PDF) on 31 July 2021

The Interim Constitution of Azad Jammu and Kashmir (Act VIII of 1974) provides for an apparently transitory autonomous parliamentary framework of self-governance and power sharing for the region of Azad Jammu and Kashmir, defined by the act as the "territories of the State of Jammu and Kashmir which have been liberated by the people of that State and for the time being under the administration of Government and such other territories as may hereafter come under its administration", however, it does not pertain to areas such as Gilgit, Hunza and Baltistan. The act succeeded and re-enacted the Azad Jammu and Kashmir Government Act, 1970 with modifications. It was promulgated under the Prime Minister of Pakistan Zulfiqar Ali Bhutto. The constitution has been amended 14 times till date. It is based on the 1973 Constitution of Pakistan.

The parliamentary system introduced a Prime Minister of Azad Kashmir as head of the government responsible for the executive power. The Prime Minister of Pakistan was to head the Azad Jammu and Kashmir Council. The Council had jurisdiction over most of the legislative functioning, including executive authority over them. Following the 13th amendment in 2018, the powers of the Council were transferred to the AJK Assembly and Pakistan government, leaving it with an advisory role. The amendment also removed importance given to the usage of the word "Act".

The Interim Constitution, along with the Karachi Agreement, Simla Agreement and United Nations Commission for India and Pakistan resolutions, form the legal connection between Pakistan and AJK., (Note: Azad Jammu and Kashmir falls under Article 1, sub-article 2, clause d of the Constitution of Pakistan "such States and territories as are or may be included in Pakistan, whether by accession or otherwise".) apart from the practical connection over the decades.

== History ==
An ordinance in 1950 "Rules of Business of Azad Kashmir Government 1950" vested powers in a "Supreme" head of state. Two years later, the rules of business were re-constituted, vesting powers in the Joint Secretary of the Ministry of Kashmir Affairs, a ministry of the government of Pakistan. In 1958, this was changed to "Chief Advisor". In 1960, inspired by the "basic democracy" system of Pakistan, an act was passed Kashmir Basic Democracies Act, 1960. This was amended in 1964, 1967, 1968.

Until 1970, the administration of Azad Kashmir (AJK) was guided by a number of provisional orders. The governing power lay with bureaucrats in the Ministry of Kashmir Affairs, a ministry of the government of Pakistan. In 1973 Pakistan got a new constitution. Subsequently, similar demands were made for AJK. The draft was introduced in the Legislative Assembly of AJK on 24 August 1974. It was passed without any deliberations in the assembly.

== Preamble ==
The preamble mentions that the 1974 constitution is successive legislation, and references the Kashmir dispute, UN mediation of the conflict, expression of self-determination through a plebiscite, Islam and the Quran. The 13th Amendment of the Constitution introduces two new paragraphs into the constitution. However, with regard to self-determination, Section 7(2) of the Interim Constitution disallows any activity that goes against the accession of AJK to Pakistan.

== About ==
The Constitution provides for the creation of the following— President, Prime Minister, Council of Ministers, Legislature, Council, High Court, Supreme Court, Chief Election Commissioner, Auditor General, Council of Islamic Ideology.

- Government of Azad Kashmir
- President of Azad Kashmir
- Prime Minister of Azad Kashmir
- Azad Jammu and Kashmir Legislative Assembly
- High Court of Azad Jammu and Kashmir
- Supreme Court of Azad Jammu and Kashmir
- Azad Jammu & Kashmir Election Commission
- Auditor General of Azad Kashmir
- Council of Islamic Ideology of Azad Kashmir

As per the constitution, AJK has its own flag and national anthem. For the purpose of this constitution, it does not pertain to the northern areas of the former state of Jammu and Kashmir.

The act provided for two executive branches, the AJK Government, and the AJK Council. The Council was based in Islamabad and was chaired by the Prime Minister of Pakistan. The Council had jurisdiction over 52 subjects including nuclear energy, aircraft, copyright, banking, insurance, stock-exchanges, census, railways, oil and gas, electricity, press, education and tourism. As per the 13th amendment in 2018, the council stands largely abolished, with only advisory powers remaining.

== Amendments ==
List of Amendments to the AJK Interim Constitution Act 1974

Amendments between 1975 and 2000
No.	Amendments	Act No.	Ref	Notes
1	AJ&K Interim Constitution (First Amendment) Act, 1975	IX of 1975		
2	AJ&K Interim Constitution (Second Amendment) Act, 1976	VII of 1976		
3	AJ&K Interim Constitution (Third Amendment) Act, 1976	VII of 1976		
4	AJ&K Constitution (Fourth Amendment) Act, 1977	I of 1977		
5	AJ&K Interim Constitution (Fifth Amendment) Act, 1977	VII of 1977		
6	AJ&K Interim Constitution (Sixth Amendment) Act, 1986	I of 1986		
7	AJ&K Interim Constitution (Seventh Amendment) Act, 1986	II of 1986		
8				
9	AJ&K Interim Constitution (Ninth Amendment) Act, 1988	IX of 1988		
10	AJ&K Interim Constitution (Tenth Amendment) Act, 1993	XX of 1993		
11	AJ&K Interim Constitution (Eleventh Amendment) Act, 2005	VII of 2005		The number of seats in the Azad Kashmir Legislative Assembly is increased from 48 to 49, with the number of general seats increasing from 40 to 41.
12	AJ&K Interim Constitution (Twelfth Amendment) Act, 2018	I of 2018		
13	AJ&K Interim Constitution (Thirteenth Amendment) Act, 2018	III of 2018		More powers are transferred to the AJK government Word "Act" deleted.
14	AJ&K Interim Constitution (Fourteenth Amendment) Act, 2020	XL of 2020		

== See also ==
- Constitution of Jammu and Kashmir

== References and notes ==
Notes

Citations

Bibliography

- Saraf, Muhammad Yusuf (2015) [1979]. Kashmiris Fight for Freedom. Vol. 2 (1947 to 1978). Mirpur, AJK: National Institute of Kashmir Studies.
- The Azad Jammu and Kashmir Laws Code (PDF), vol. II From 1963-1970, Department of Law, Justice, Parliamentary Affairs & Human Rights. Azad Government of the State of Jammu and Kashmir, 2008 [1984]
- Gilani, Justice Syed Manzoor Hussain (2019) [1988]. The Constitution of Azad Jammu & Kashmir: In the historical backdrop with corresponding Pakistan, India & Occupied Jammu & Kashmir Constitutions (PDF). Lahore, Pakistan: Jumhoori Publications. ISBN 9789696521471.
- "III. Constitutional Structure of Azad Kashmir and Its Relationship to Pakistan" (PDF), "With Friends Like These…", Volume 18, no. 12 (C), Human Rights Watch, September 2006
- Shekhawat, Seema (2007). "Electoral Politics in Pakistan-Occupied Kashmir". India Quarterly. 63 (3): 145–167. doi:10.1177/097492840706300306. ISSN 0974-9284. JSTOR 45073208. S2CID 155709503.
- Ali, Shaheen Sardar; Rehman, Javaid (2013). Indigenous Peoples and Ethnic Minorities of Pakistan: Constitutional and Legal Perspectives. Monograph Series No. 84. Nordic Institute of Asian Studies. Great Britain: Routledge Curzon. ISBN 978-1-136-77868-1 – via Google Books.
- Hayat, Javaid (April 2014). Azad Jammu & Kashmir (AJK): Prospects for Democratic Governance Amidst Ambiguous Sovereignty, Absence of Self-determination and Enduring Conflict (PDF) (Thesis thesis). Berlin: Otto-Suhr-Institut. doi:10.17169/refubium-15279.
- Rose, Leo E (2019). "11: The Politics of Azad Kashmir". In Thomas, Raju GC (ed.). Perspectives On Kashmir: The Roots Of Conflict In South Asia. Routledge. ISBN 978-1-000-30136-6.
