= LA-21 Poonch & Sudhnoti-IV =

Constituency of the Azad Kashmir Legislative Assembly

- Constituency for the Azad Kashmir Legislative Assembly
- District: Poonch District
- Electorate: 88,220

Current constituency
- Party: Jammu Kashmir Peoples Party
- Member: Hassan Ibrahim Khan
- Created from: LA-19 Poonch & Sudhnoti-III

LA-21 Poonch & Sudhnoti-IV is a constituency of the Azad Kashmir Legislative Assembly which is currently represented by Hassan Ibrahim Khan of the Jammu Kashmir Peoples Party (JKPP). It covers half of the area of Rawalakot Tehsil in Poonch District.

== Election 2016 ==
General elections were held in this constituency on 21 July 2016.

General election 2016: LA-19 Poonch & Sudhnoti-III
| Party | Candidate | Votes | % | ±% |
|---|---|---|---|---|
| JKPP | Sardar Khalid Ibrahim Khan | 24,950 | | |
| PPP | Farzana Ahmad Yaqoob | 15,965 | | |
| JI | Sardar Ejaz Afzal Khan Adovoate | 4,789 | | |
| PTI | Sardar Nayyar Ayub Khan | 3,886 | | |
| Independent | Sardar Liaqat Hayyat Khan | 2,387 | | |
| Independent | Muhammad Nawaz | 575 | | |
| Independent | Muhammad Hanif Khan Awan Advocate | 269 | | |
| Independent | Dr. Muhammad Irfan Kiyani | 222 | | |
| PRHP | Naveed Asghar | 210 | | |
| Jammu and Kashmir National Party | Sardar Rabyaz Advocate | 146 | | |
| Independent | Engineer Sardar Muhamamd Ashraf Khan | 56 | | |
| Independent | Doctor Haleem | 40 | | |
| Muttahida Kashmir Peoples National Party | Sardar Aftab Khan | 24 | | |
| Turnout | | 53,559 | | |

== By-election 2018 ==
A by-election was held on 30 December 2018 due to the death of Sardar Khalid Ibrahim Khan, the previous MLA from this seat.

By-election 2018: LA-19 Poonch & Sudhnoti-III
| Party | Candidate | Votes | % | ±% |
|---|---|---|---|---|
| JKPP | Sardar Hassan Ibrahim Khan | 17,590 | 36.80 | |
| PPP | Sardar Muhammad Yaqoob Khan | 16,776 | 35.09 | |
| PML(N) | Tahir Anwar Khan | 10,255 | 21.45 | |
| Jammu and Kashmir National Awami Party | Sardar Liaqat Hayyat Khan | 2,083 | 4.36 | |
| Independent | Ajmal Afsar | 761 | 1.59 | |
| Independent | Naveed Asghar | 338 | 0.71 | |
| Turnout | | 47,803 | 51.72 | |
| Majority | | 814 | 1.70 | |
| Registered electors | | 92,427 | | |
| JKPP hold | | | | |

== Election 2021 ==
General elections were held on 25 July 2021.

General election 2021: LA-21 Poonch & Sudhnoti-IV
| Party | Candidate | Votes | % | ±% |
|---|---|---|---|---|
| JKPP | Hassan Ibrahim Khan | 8,190 | 23.46 | ▼13.34 |
| PML(N) | Tahir Anwar Khan | 6,198 | 17.75 | ▼3.70 |
| PTI | Nayyar Ayub Khan | 5,502 | 15.76 | |
| PPP | Sardar Muhammad Yaqoob Khan | 4,410 | 12.63 | ▼22.46 |
| Independent | Muhammad Abid Khan | 2,744 | 7.86 | |
| Independent | Ejaz Yousaf | 2,353 | 6.74 | |
| AJKMC | Azhar Hussain Khan | 1,526 | 4.37 | |
| JI | Sardar Qayyum Afsar Khan | 1,411 | 4.04 | |
| Others | Others (eight candidates) | 2,581 | 7.39 | |
| Turnout | | 34,915 | 39.58 | ▼12.14 |
| Majority | | 1,992 | 5.71 | ▲4.01 |
| Registered electors | | 88,220 | | |
| JKPP hold | | | | |
