= Muhammad Najeeb Naqi Khan =

Pakistani politician

Muhammad Najeeb Naqi Khan ڈاکٹرمحمد نجیب نقی خان President of Azad Kashmir
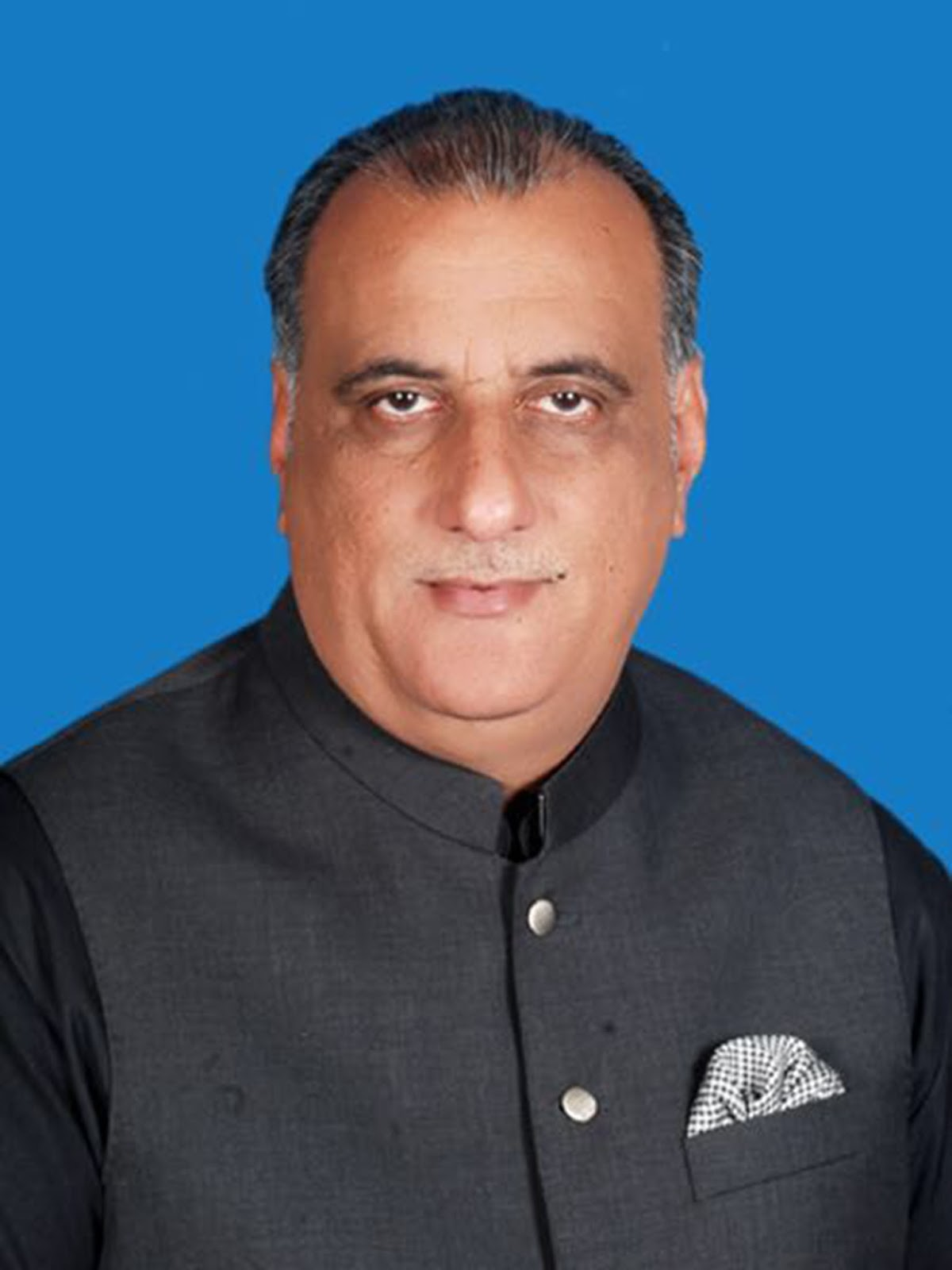

President of Azad Kashmir
- Incumbent
- Assumed office 24 September 2026
- Prime Minister: Iftikhar Gilani
- Preceded by: Chaudhry Tariq Farooq (acting)

MLA Minister for Finance and Health
- In office 7 August 2016 – August 2021
- President: Masood Khan
- Prime Minister: Farooq Haider Khan

Parliamentary Secretary, Health & P&D
- In office 1991–1996

Opposition Member, Azad Jammu & Kashmir Legislative Assembly
- In office 1996–2001

Member, Kashmir Council
- In office 2001–2006

MLA Minister for Health, Education (Colleges & Universities) & IT
- In office 2006–2011

Opposition Member, Azad Jammu & Kashmir Legislative Assembly
- In office 2011–2016

Personal details
- Born: Rawalpindi, Punjab, Pakistan
- Citizenship: Pakistani
- Party: Pakistan Muslim League Nawaz
- Parent: Colonel M. Naqi Khan (father)
- Education: King Edward Medical College
- Profession: Politician

Muhammad Najeeb Naqi Khan (Urdu: ڈاکٹر محمد نجیب نقی خان) is a Azad Kashmiri politician and the current President of Azad Jammu and Kashmir.

He previously served as former Health and Finance Minister of Azad Jammu Kashmir.

== Personal life ==
Najeeb Naqi Khan was born on 19 January 1964 in Rawalapindi. He spent his childhood in Lahore and studied from Aitchison College and later graduated with MBBS degree from King Edward Medical College. His father Col (Rtd) Muhammad Naqi Khan served in the army and later joined politics and served as Senior Advisor to Prime Minister AJK, Member of AJK Legislative Assembly and Minister for Health & Food AJK. He died in a road accident while campaigning for 1990 general elections.

His grandfather Baba-e-Poonch Khan Sahib Col. Khan Muhammad Khan is remembered for his multifaceted services as a soldier, social reformer, political leader and freedom fighter. He served in the British Indian Army and after retiring engaged himself in social welfare and launched the "Muthi Bhar Atta" funding scheme to establish various educational institutions in the region. He founded the Sudhan Educational Conference in 1934, one of the oldest education-based charitable trusts in the subcontinent, contributing towards education of the deserving children even today. He got elected to the 1st Legislative Assembly of Jammu & Kashmir called the Jammu & Kashmir Praja Sabha in 1934 and remained a member till 1946. In 1947, he became Chairman of War Council and played a pivotal role in getting AJK liberated from Maharaja's rule.

== Political career ==
Najeeb Naqi Khan started his political career after the untimely death of his father in a road accident while campaigning for general elections in 1990. Najeeb Naqi Khan has been elected as member of AJ&K Legislative Assembly for five terms from his native constituency of Pallandari and once remained a member of Azad Jammu and Kashmir Council.

He won district status for Sudhanoti in 1995 with strong support from Sardar Mohammad Abdul Qayyum Khan. Najeeb Naqi continues his endeavors for the development of his constituency. District Hospital Sudhanoti is one such project.

== Presidency ==
On 24 September 2026, Naqi was elected as President of Azad Kashmir after he secured 32 votes in the election held at the 53-member Azad Kashmir Legislative Assembly’s Secretariat, while his opponent Pakistan Peoples Party’s Chaudhry Latif Akbar secured 13 votes. On the same day, he was sworn in by the AJK Chief Justice Raja Saeed Akram at a ceremony held at the President’s House in Muzaffarabad.

== Political positions ==
- Member Azad Jammu Kashmir Legislative Assembly/Minister for Health, Finance, Planning and Development (2016-2021).
- Member Azad Jammu Kashmir Legislative Assembly (2011-2016).
- Member Azad Jammu Kashmir Legislative Assembly/Minister for Health, Population Welfare, Education (Colleges) and Information Technology (2006-2011).
- Member Azad Jammu Kashmir Council (2001-2006).
- Member Azad Jammu Kashmir Legislative Assembly (1996-2001)
- Member Azad Jammu Kashmir Legislative Assembly/Parliamentary Secretary for Health, Planning and Development (1991-1996)
