= Raja Muhammad Riasat Khan =

Pakistani politician

- راجہ محمد ریاست خان

Member of the Azad Kashmir Legislative Assembly
- Incumbent
- Assumed office 24 August 2026
- Preceded by: Chaudhry Amir Yaseen
- Constituency: LA-12 Kotli-V

Personal details
- Party: Pakistan Muslim League (N) (PML-N)

Raja Muhammad Riasat Khan (Urdu: راجہ محمد ریاست خان) is a Pakistani politician who has been a member of the Azad Kashmir Legislative Assembly since August 2026.

== Political career ==
Riasat contested the 2021 Azad Kashmiri general election from LA-12 Kotli-V as a candidate of Pakistan Muslim League (N) (PML(N)), but was unsuccessful. He received 20,080 votes and was defeated by Chaudhry Muhammad Yasin, a candidate of Pakistan People's Party (PPP).

He contested an October 2021 by-election from LA-12 Kotli-V as a candidate of PML(N), but was unsuccessful. He received 17,894 votes and was defeated by Chaudhry Amir Yaseen, a candidate of PPP.

He was elected to the Azad Kashmir Legislative Assembly from LA-12 Kotli-V as a candidate of PML(N) in the 2026 Azad Kashmiri general election. He received 35,168 votes, while the runner-up, Chaudhry Muhammad Yasin of PPP, received 30,320 votes.

On 4 September 2026, he was sworn into the cabinet of Prime Minister Ifitikhar Gilani.
