= Mukhtar Ahmad Khan Abbasi =

Pakistani politician

Sardar Mukhtar Ahmad Khan Abbasi
- سردار مختار احمد خان عباسی

Member of the Azad Kashmir Legislative Assembly
- Incumbent
- Assumed office 24 August 2026
- Preceded by: Khawaja Farooq Ahmed
- Constituency: LA-29 Muzaffarabad-III

Personal details
- Party: Pakistan People's Party

Sardar Mukhtar Ahmad Khan Abbasi (Urdu: سردار مختار احمد خان عباسی) is a Pakistani politician who has been a member of the Azad Kashmir Legislative Assembly since August 2026.

== Political career ==
Abbasi won the 2026 Azad Kashmiri general election from LA-29 Muzaffarabad-III as a candidate of the Pakistan People's Party (PPP). According to unofficial and provisional results, he received 19,792 votes, while the runner-up, Iftikhar Gilani of the Pakistan Muslim League (N) (PML(N)), received 16,413 votes.

After the election, PPP nominated him for the position of Prime Minister, but he was unsuccessful. He received 14 votes and was defeated by Iftikhar Gilani of PML(N).
