= Umair Naeem =

Pakistani politician

- عمیر نعیم

Member of the Azad Kashmir Legislative Assembly
- Incumbent
- Assumed office 24 August 2026
- Preceded by: Chaudhry Javed Iqbal Budhanvi
- Constituency: LA-9 Kotli-II

Personal details
- Party: Pakistan Muslim League (N) (PML-N)

Umair Naeem (Urdu: عمیر نعیم) is a Pakistani politician who has been a member of the Azad Kashmir Legislative Assembly since August 2026.

== Political career ==
Naeem was elected to the Azad Kashmir Legislative Assembly from LA-9 Kotli-II as a candidate of Pakistan Muslim League (N) (PML(N)) in the 2026 Azad Kashmiri general election. He received 31,680 votes, while the runner-up, Javed Iqbal Budhanvi of the Pakistan People's Party, received 29,098 votes.

On 4 September 2026, he was sworn into the cabinet of Prime Minister Ifitikhar Gilani.
