= Saqib Majeed Raja =

Pakistani politician

- ثاقب مجید راجہ

Member of the Azad Kashmir Legislative Assembly
- Incumbent
- Assumed office 24 August 2026
- Preceded by: Chaudhry Latif Akbar
- Constituency: LA-31 Muzaffarabad-V

Personal details
- Party: Pakistan Muslim League (N) (2025-present)
- Other political affiliations: All Jammu and Kashmir Muslim Conference (until 2025)
- Relations: Attique Ahmed Khan (father-in-law)

Saqib Majeed Raja (Urdu: ثاقب مجید راجہ) is a Pakistani politician who has been a member of the Azad Kashmir Legislative Assembly since August 2026. He is the son-in-law of Attique Ahmed Khan, the 7th and 10th Prime Minister of Azad Kashmir.

== Political career ==
Raja contested the 2021 Azad Kashmiri general election from LA-31 Muzaffarabad-V as a candidate of All Jammu and Kashmir Muslim Conference (AJKMC), but was unsuccessful. He received votes and was defeated by Chaudhry Latif Akbar, a candidate of Pakistan People's Party (PPP).

He joined Pakistan Muslim League (N) (PML(N)) on 27 December 2025.

He was elected to the Azad Kashmir Legislative Assembly from LA-31 Muzaffarabad-V as a candidate of PML(N) in the 2026 Azad Kashmiri general election. He received 32,511 votes, while the runner-up, Chaudhry Latif Akbar of PPP, received 23,957 votes.

On 4 September 2026, he was sworn into the cabinet of Prime Minister Ifitikhar Gilani.
