= Azad Jammu and Kashmir Election Commission =

Constitutional body in AJK-Pakistan

Azad Jammu & Kashmir Election Commission آزاد جموں و کشمیر انتخابی ماموریہ
- AJKEC

Agency overview
- Formed: 1969
- Jurisdiction: Azad Kashmir
- Headquarters: Muzaffarabad, Azad Kashmir
- Motto: Free, Fair, Impartial
- Agency executive: Ghulam Mustafa Mughal, Chief Election Commissioner
- Website: ec.ajk.gov.pk

The Azad Jammu & Kashmir Election Commission (Urdu: آزاد جموں و کشمیر انتخابی ماموریہ; AJKEC) is an independent, autonomous, permanent and constitutionally established body responsible for organizing and conducting elections to the Azad Jammu and Kashmir Legislative Assembly, Kashmir council, local governments, and the office of President of Azad Kashmir, as well as the delimitation of constituencies and preparation of electoral rolls. In accordance with the principles set down in the Interim Constitution of AJK, the commission makes the necessary measures to guarantee that the election is conducted honestly, justly, fairly, and in compliance with the law, and that corrupt practices are prevented.

The Election Commission was established in1969, and has undergone numerous restructuring and reformations throughout the history of Interim Constitution of AJK.

== Function and duties ==
The Interim Constitution of AJK defines and establishes the roles and responsibilities of the Azad Jammu & Kashmir Election Commission (AJKEC) in sub-article (7) of article 50, which gives the commission the following responsibilities:

- Establishing and annually reviewing electoral records for Azad Jammu and Kashmir Legislative Assembly elections.
- Coordinating and holding elections for the Azad Jammu and Kashmir Legislative Assembly as well as filling temporary vacancies in legislative assembly or house.
- Elections for local body government institutions are to be planned and held.
- Election Tribunals are to be appointed.
- Upon receiving a reference from the Speaker, or head of the political party, as applicable to decide cases of disqualification of members of the legislative assembly under the Interim Constitution of AJK.
- To organize and carry out the presidential election in accordance with the Interim Constitution of AJK.
- Referendums are to be held as and when the President of AJK directs.

== Autonomy and independence ==
The Commission maintains complete financial independence and is not subject to any form of government regulation. The commission conducts general elections in AJK, as well as by-elections that are chosen by the Election Commission itself, without interference from the government. The commission also makes arrangements for the maintenance of law and order, creates polling plans, hires polling staff, assigns voters, and makes polling locations.

== Organogram ==
The AKKEC consists of the Chief Election Commissioner, who shall act as the Chairman and two Members. Chief Election Commissioner appointed by the President of AJK on the advice of the Chairman of the Kashmir Council and the members of Election Commission appoints the Prime Minister of Azad Jammu & Kashmir after consultation with the leader of opposition in the legislative assembly.

=== Chief Election Commissioners ===
| No. | Name | Tenure |
|---|---|---|
| 1 | Justice A.R Khan | 27-12-1969 to 22-2-1970 |
| 2 | Justice Masood Ahmed | 30-05-1970 to 1970 |
| 3 | Ghulam Rasool Sheikh | 09-08-1974 to 01-08-1977 |
| 4 | Muhammad Gul | 02-08-1977 to 01-06-1987 |
| 5 | Sardar Muhammad Ashraf Khan | 02-06-1987 to 17-04-1999 |
| 6 | Muhammad Siddique Farooqi | 20-04-1999 to 07-10-2000 |
| 7 | Sher Zaman Chaudary | 30-11-2000 to 29-11-2003 |
| 8 | Manzoor Hussain Gialani | 06-12-2003 to 07-05-2005 |
| 9 | Riaz Akhtar Chaudary | 11-07-2005 to 29-10-2008 |
| 10 | Khawaja Muhammad Saeed | 30-10-2008 to 28-10-2012 |
| 11 | Munir Ahmed Chaudhary | 29-04-2013 to 14-04-2015 |
| 12 | Ghulam Mustafa Mughal | 19-02-2016 to 19-02-2019 |
| 13 | Abdul Rasheed Sulehria | 14-01-2020 to 13-01-2025 |
| 14 | Ghulam Mustafa Mughal | 20-02-2026 to present |

=== Members ===
| No. | Name | Tenure |
|---|---|---|
| 1 | Muhammad Farooq Niaz | |
| 2 | Farhat Ali Mir | 09-03-2021 to present |

== Judicial review ==
If an Election Commission decision has a jurisdictional flaw, is made in bad faith, or is coram non-judice, which means it was made outside of the court's jurisdiction, judicial review may be requested in the High Court of Azad Jammu and Kashmir and Supreme Court of Azad Jammu and Kashmir.

== See also ==
- Election Commission of Pakistan
- Election Commission Gilgit-Baltistan
- Azad Jammu and Kashmir Legislative Assembly
