= Chaudhry Muhammad Yasin =

Pakistani politician

- چوہدری محمد یٰسین

Member of the Azad Kashmir Legislative Assembly
- Incumbent
- Assumed office 25 July 2011
- Preceded by: Raja Munsif Dad
- Constituency: LA-10 Kotli-III (2021-present); LA-11 Kotli-IV (2011-2021)

Leader of the Opposition in the Azad Kashmir Legislative Assembly
- Preceded by: Raja Farooq Haider Khan
- Succeeded by: Chaudhry Latif Akbar
- In office 4 August 2016 – 3 August 2021
- Preceded by: Shah Ghulam Qadir

Personal details
- Party: Pakistan People's Party

Chaudhry Muhammad Yasin (Urdu: چوہدری محمد یٰسین) is a Pakistani politician who has been the Leader of the Opposition in the Azad Kashmir Legislative Assembly since August 2026. He previously served as Leader of the Opposition from August 2016 to August 2021. He has been a member of the Assembly since July 2011.

== Political career ==
Yasin was elected to the Azad Kashmir Legislative Assembly from LA-11 Kotli-IV as a candidate of Pakistan People's Party (PPP) in the 2011 Azad Kashmiri general election.

On 26 July 2011, he was sworn into the cabinet of Prime Minister Chaudhry Abdul Majid as a Senior Minister.

He was re-elected to the Assembly from LA-11 Kotli-IV as a candidate of PPP in the 2016 Azad Kashmiri general election. He received 27,566 votes and defeated Raja Muhammad Iqbal Khan, a candidate of PML(N).

After the election, he was nominated by PPP for the office of Prime Minister, but was unsuccessful. He received 5 votes and was defeated by Raja Farooq Haider Khan, a candidate of PML(N).

On 4 August 2016, he was appointed as the Leader of the Opposition in the Assembly.

He was re-elected to the Assembly from LA-10 Kotli-III and LA-12 Kotli-V as a candidate of PPP in the 2021 Azad Kashmiri general election. From LA-10 Kotli-III, he received 9,562 votes and defeated Malik Muhammad Yousaf, a candidate of Pakistan Tehreek-e-Insaf (PTI). From LA-12 Kotli-V, he received 21,527 votes and defeated Raja Muhammad Riasat Khan, a candidate of PML(N). He chose to retain LA-10 Kotli-III and vacate LA-12 Kotli-V. The resulting by-election for the latter constituency was won by his son, Chaudhry Amir Yasin.

On 1 September 2021, he was appointed as the president of PPP's Azad Kashmir chapter.

He was re-elected to the Assembly from LA-10 Kotli-III as a candidate of the PPP in the 2026 Azad Kashmiri general election. He received 12,431 votes, while the runner-up, Fateh Mehmood-ul-Hassan of PML(N), received 9,246 votes. In the same election, he contested from LA-12 Kotli-V as a candidate of PPP, but was unsuccessful. He received 30,320 votes and was defeated by Raja Muhammad Riasat Khan, a candidate of PML(N).

On 28 August 2026, he was once again appointed as the Leader of the Opposition in the Assembly.
