= Mustafa Bashir Abbasi =

Pakistani politician

- مصطفیٰ بشیر عباسی

Member of the Azad Kashmir Legislative Assembly
- Incumbent
- Assumed office 24 August 2026
- Preceded by: Chaudhry Muhammad Rasheed
- Constituency: LA-30 Muzaffarabad-IV
- In office 30 July 2016 – 3 August 2021
- Preceded by: Chaudhry Muhammad Rasheed
- Succeeded by: Chaudhry Muhammad Rasheed
- Constituency: LA-29 Muzaffarabad-VI

Personal details
- Party: Pakistan Muslim League (N)

Mustafa Bashir Abbasi (Urdu: مصطفیٰ بشیر عباسی) is a Pakistani politician who has been a member of the Azad Kashmir Legislative Assembly since August 2026. He previously served as a member of the Assembly from July 2016 to August 2021.

== Political career ==
Abbasi was elected to the Azad Kashmir Legislative Assembly from LA-29 Muzaffarabad-VI as a candidate of Pakistan Muslim League (N) (PML(N)) in the 2016 Azad Kashmiri general election.

On 3 November 2018, he was sworn into the cabinet of Prime Minister Raja Farooq Haider Khan, and was made the Minister for Information Technology, the Technical Education and Vocational Training Authority, and Population Welfare.

He contested the 2021 Azad Kashmiri general election from LA-30 Muzaffarabad-IV as a candidate of PML(N), but was unsuccessful. He received 10,557 votes and was defeated by Chaudhry Muhammad Rasheed, a candidate of Pakistan Tehreek-e-Insaf (PTI).

He was re-elected to the Assembly from LA-30 Muzaffarabad-IV as a candidate of PML(N) in the 2026 Azad Kashmiri general election. He received 17,895 votes, while the runner-up, Mubashir Munir Awan of Pakistan People's Party (PPP), received 12,323 votes.

On 4 September 2026, he was sworn into the cabinet of Prime Minister Ifitikhar Gilani.
