= LA-33 Muzaffarabad-VII =

Constituency of the Azad Kashmir Legislative Assembly

- Constituency for the Azad Kashmir Legislative Assembly
- District: Hattian Bala District
- Electorate: 67,868

Current constituency
- Party: Pakistan People's Party
- Member: Dewan Ali Khan Chughtai
- Created from: LA-29 Muzaffarabad-VI

LA-33 Muzaffarabad-VII is a constituency of Azad Kashmir Legislative Assembly which is currently represented by Dewan Ali Khan Chughtai of the Pakistan People's Party (PPP). It covers the area of Leepa Tehsil in Hattian Bala District.

== Election 2016 ==
General elections were held in this constituency on 21 July 2016.

General election 2016: LA-29 Muzaffarabad-VI
Party	Candidate	Votes	%	±%
PML(N)	Mustafa Bashir Abbasi	22,186		
PPP	Chaudhry Muhammad Rasheed	18,777		
AJKMC	Dewan Ali Khan Chughtai	15,360		
KTI	Liaqat Qayyum Abbasi	92		
Independent	Muneer Akhtar	82		
Independent	Chaudhary Muhammad Shafi	64		
Independent	Naveed Ahmad Abbasi	40		
MWM	Syed Iftikhar Hussain Shah	20		
Independent	Atiq Ur Rehman Awan	15		
Turnout		53,636		

== Election 2021 ==
General elections were held on 25 July 2021.

General election 2021: LA-33 Muzaffarabad-VII
Party	Candidate	Votes	%	±%
PTI	Dewan Ali Khan Chughtai	26,474	54.08	
PML(N)	Raja Farooq Haider Khan	14,384	29.38	
PPP	Muhammad Javed	5,739	11.72	
Others	Others (seven candidates)	2,356	4.81	
Turnout		48,953	72.13	
Majority		12,090	24.70	
Registered electors		67,868		
PTI gain from PML(N)				

== Election 2026 ==
Elections were held on 2 August 2026. Dewan Ali Khan Chughtai won the election with 25,882 votes.

General election 2021: LA-33 Muzaffarabad-VII
Party	Candidate	Votes	%	±%
PPP	Dewan Ali Khan Chughtai	25,882	50.63	▲38.91
PML(N)	Muhammad Rasheed	21,481	42.02	▲12.64
IPP	Abdul Jabbar	1,204	2.36	
Independent	Muhammad Saadat Danish	1,059	2.07	
Others	Others (sixteen candidates)	1,491	2.92	
Turnout		51,117	58.90	▼13.23
Majority		4,401	8.61	
Registered electors		86,790		
PPP gain from PTI				
