= Muhammad Yaqoob Khan =

Pakistani businessman and politician

Sardar Muhammad Yaqoob Khan
- سردار محمد یعقوب خان
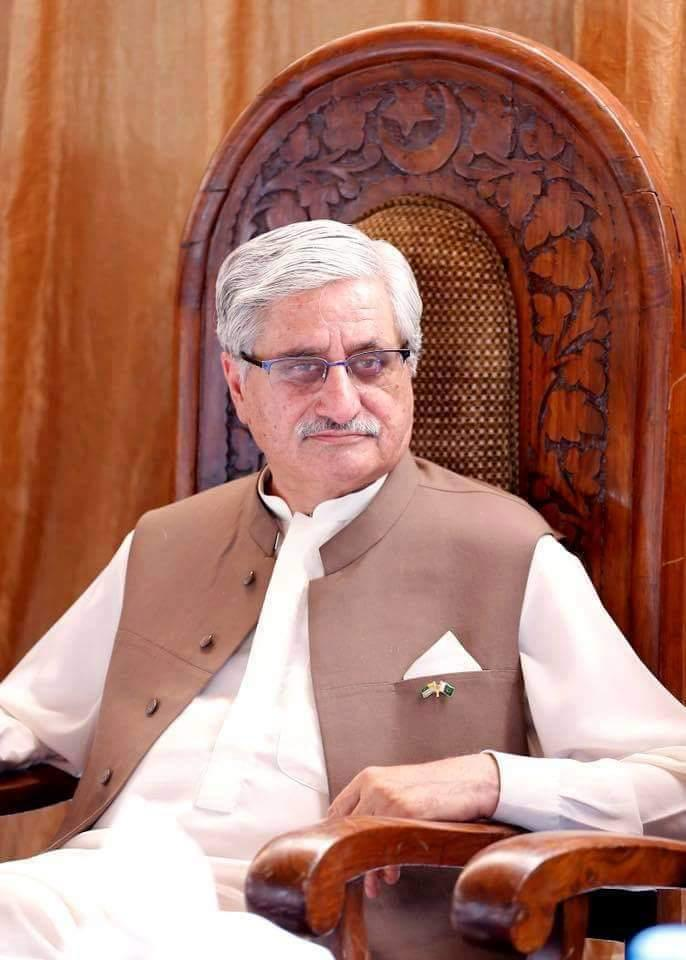
- Khan in 2015

Prime Minister of Azad Kashmir
- In office 7 January 2009 – 22 October 2009
- Preceded by: Attique Ahmed Khan
- Succeeded by: Raja Farooq Haider Khan

President of Azad Kashmir
- In office 25 August 2011 – 25 August 2016
- Preceded by: Raja Zulqarnain Khan
- Succeeded by: Masood Khan

Member of the Azad Kashmir Legislative Assembly
- In office 3 August 2021 – 25 August 2026
- Preceded by: New seat
- Constituency: LA-20 Poonch & Sudhnoti-III
- In office 24 July 2001 – 25 August 2011
- Preceded by: Sardar Muhammad Ashraf Khan
- Succeeded by: Khalid Ibrahim Khan
- Constituency: LA-19 Poonch & Sudhnoti-III

Personal details
- Born: Rawalakot, Azad Kashmir, Pakistan
- Party: PPP (2011–present)
- Children: Sardar Fahad Yaqoob (son); Sardar Faisal Yaqoob (son); Farzana Yaqoob (daughter)
- Education: Karachi University

Sardar Muhammad Yaqoob Khan (Urdu: سردار محمد یعقوب خان) is an Azad Kashmiri businessman and politician. He served as the President of Azad Kashmir from 25 August 2011 to 25 August 2016. He also served as the Prime Minister of Azad Kashmir from 7 January 2009 to 22 October 2009. Beside politics, Khan is also serving as the Chairman of YK Group of Companies. He has also been a member of the Azad Kashmir Legislative Assembly from July 2001 to August 2011 and from August 2021 to August 2026.

== Early life ==
Sardar Muhammad Yaqoob Khan was born in 1953 in the village of Ali Sojal, Rawalakot Tehsil, Azad Kashmir. He belongs to a prominent Sadozai family and is the brother of Late Haji Muhammad Zaman Khan, former MLA and a well-known figure in Azad Kashmir's political and social circles.

Khan received his graduation degree education from Karachi University. He began his political career in Karachi with the Punjabi Pakhtoon Ittehad, an ethnic political party that aimed to promote unity among the Punjabi and Pashtun communities. Later, he joined the Tahreek-e-Amil, an Azad Kashmiri political party, and rose through the ranks to become its senior vice president. Additionally, he was affiliated with the All Jammu and Kashmir Muslim Conference, a prominent political party in the region.

== Political career ==
Khan was elected to the Azad Kashmir Legislative Assembly from LA-19 Poonch & Sudhnoti-III as a candidate of All Jammu and Kashmir Muslim Conference (AJKMC) in the 2001 Azad Kashmiri general election.

He was re-elected to the Assembly from LA-19 Poonch & Sudhnoti-III as an independent candidate in the 2006 Azad Kashmiri general election. He decided to run as an independent as he was refused the AJKMC nomination as the candidate in his constituency. After the election, he, along with three other AJKMC members who were denied nominations, formed the "Haqiqi" group, a breakaway faction of AJKMC.

Khan became the 8th Prime Minister of Azad Jammu and Kashmir on 7 January 2009 after a successful no confidence vote against Attique Ahmed Khan. He resigned from the office on 22 October 2009 to avoid a political controversy in the Legislative Assembly amid a no-confidence motion that was submitted against him. He contested the subsequent prime ministerial election, but was unsuccessful. He received 19 votes and was defeated by Raja Farooq Haider Khan, who received 29 votes.

He was re-elected to the Assembly from LA-19 Poonch & Sudhnoti-III as a candidate of Pakistan People's Party (PPP) in the 2011 Azad Kashmiri general election. He defeated Khalid Ibrahim Khan, a candidate and leader of Jammu Kashmir People's Party (JKPP), by around 10,000 votes.

He was elected as the 22nd President of Azad Jammu and Kashmir on 25 August 2011 succeeding Raja Zulqarnain Khan. He completed his term on 25 August 2016 and was succeeded by Masood Khan.

He contested a December 2018 by-election from LA-19 Poonch & Sudhnoti-III as a candidate of PPP, but was unsuccessful. He received 16,776 votes and was defeated by Hassan Ibrahim Khan, a candidate and leader of JKPP.

He was re-elected to the Assembly from LA-20 Poonch & Sudhnoti-III as a candidate of PPP in the 2021 Azad Kashmiri general election. He received 11,925 votes and defeated Abdul Rashid Khan, a candidate of Pakistan Muslim League (N) (PML(N)). In the same election, he contested from LA-21 Poonch & Sudhnoti-IV as a candidate of PPP, but was unsuccessful. He was defeated by Hassan Ibrahim Khan, a candidate and leader of JKPP.

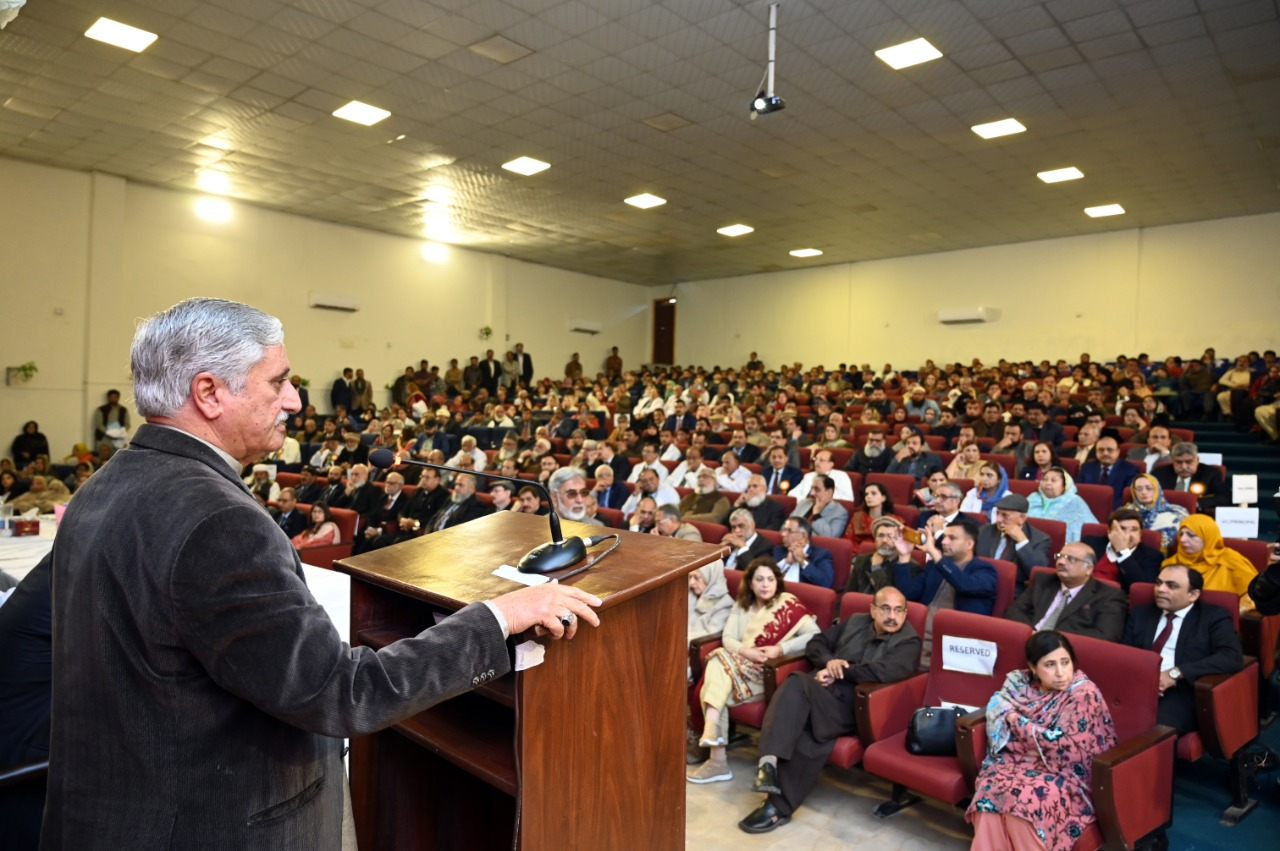
Sardar Yaqoob Khan Addressing a Convention in AJK

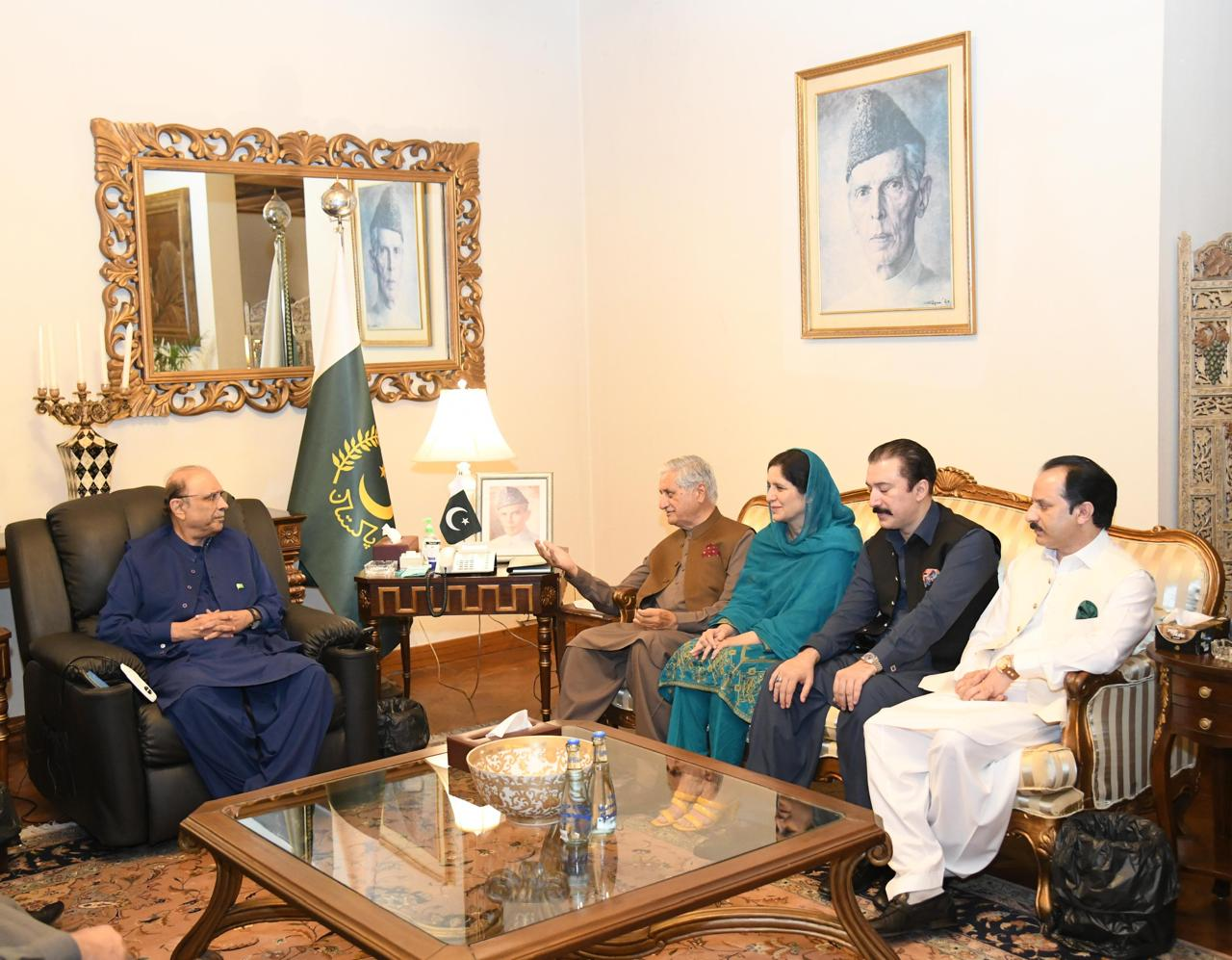
Sardar Yaqoob Khan Meeting with President of Pakistan Asif Ali Zardari on 12th May 2024

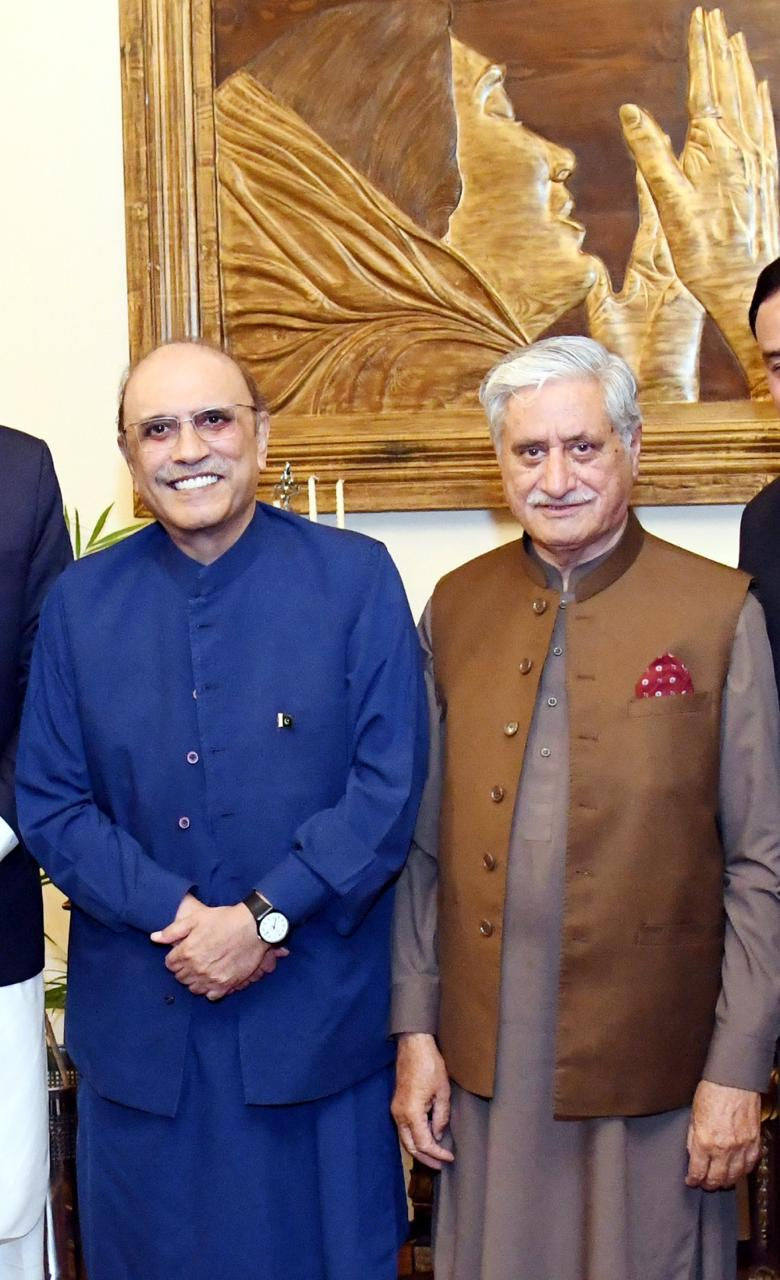
Sardar Yaqoob Khan with President of Pakistan Asif Ali Zardari on 12th May 2024

== Business ==
Khan founded Kashmir Overseas Employment Services (KOES) in 1976 to facilitate the employment of Pakistani workers in the Middle East and other regions. With over 40 years of experience working with global business enterprises, he has been a pioneer in the overseas employment business in Pakistan.

=== Real Estate Development ===
Khan founded Brother Construction Y-K (Pvt) Ltd., which has developed two successful housing societies:

Al Madina City: Adjacent to Sectors C-18 and C-19 of Islamabad.

Al Makkah City: Adjacent to Gulberg Green and OPF Islamabad.

=== Manufacturing ===
Kashmir Polypropylene (Pvt) Ltd (KPPL) is a leading enterprise established by Khan, engaged in the production of packing materials and Polypropylene Manufacturing.

=== Hospitality ===
Khan has also invested in the hospitality sector, founding two hotels in Rawalpindi:

Al Jabbal Hotel

Rex Hotel

In 2007, Khan consolidated his various business ventures under the umbrella of YK Group.
