= LA-12 Kotli-V =

Electoral district in Azad Jammu and Kashmir

- Constituency for the Azad Kashmir Legislative Assembly
- District: Kotli District
- Electorate: 106,428

Current constituency
- Party: Pakistan People's Party
- Member: Amir Yasin Chaudhry

LA-12 Kotli-V is a constituency of the Azad Kashmir Legislative Assembly which is currently represented by Amir Yasin Chaudhry of the Pakistan People's Party (PPP). It covers the area of Charhoi Tehsil in Kotli District.

== Election 2016 ==
General elections were held on 21 July 2016.

Azad Kashmir Election 2016: LA-11 (Kotli-IV)
Party	Candidate	Votes	%	±%
PPP	Chaudhry Muhammad Yasin	27,566		
PML(N)	Raja Muhammad Iqbal Khan	25,739		
PTI	Shaukat Farid	6,459		
Public Rights Party	Haider Ali Tipu	417		
Independent	Shahnawaz Yassen	114		
Independent	Muhammad Shafiq	81		
Independent	Saeed Hussain	70		
Independent	Muhammad Ashraf Khokhar	34		
Independent	Nazim Hussain	29		
Independent	Raja Asif Mehmmod	22		
Independent	Naeem Munsif Khan	17		
Independent	Chaudry Liaqat Ali Azhar	11		
Qaumi Ittehad Party	Sajid Mehmmod Chaudry	10		
Independent	Raja Aftab Ahmed Khan	8		
Turnout		60,577		

== Election 2021 ==
General elections were held on 25 July 2021.

General election 2021: LA-12 Kotli-V
Party	Candidate	Votes	%	±%
PPP	Chaudhry Muhammad Yasin	21,527	31.71	
PML(N)	Raja Muhammad Riasat Khan	20,081	29.58	
PTI	Shaukat Farid	17,525	25.82	
TLP	Arshad Mehmood	4,365	6.43	
AJKMC	Naeem Mansab Dad Khan	3,153	4.64	
Others	Others (thirteen candidates)	1,229	1.81	
Turnout		67,880	63.78	
Majority		1,446	2.13	
Registered electors		106,428		
PPP hold				

== By-election 2021 ==
A by-election was held on 10 October 2021 due to the vacation of this seat by Chaudhry Muhammad Yasin, who had chosen to take oath as MLA from LA-10 Kotli-III, another seat he had won in the 2021 elections.

By-election 2021: LA-12 Kotli-V
Party	Candidate	Votes	%	±%
PPP	Amir Yaseen Chaudhry	23,980	37.39	▲5.68
PTI	Shaukat Farid	19,101	29.78	▲3.96
PML(N)	Raja Muhammad Riasat Khan	17,944	27.98	▼1.60
TLP	Arshad Mehmood	2,527	3.94	▼2.49
Others	Others (ten candidates)	87	0.14	
Total valid votes		64,133	99.24	
Rejected ballots		494	0.76	
Turnout		64,627	60.72	▼3.06
Majority		4,879	7.61	▲5.48
Registered electors		106,428		
PPP hold				

== Election 2026 ==
General elections were held on 27 July 2026. Raja Muhammad Riasat Khan of Pakistan Muslim League (N) (PML(N)) won the election with 35,168 votes.

General election 2026: LA-12 Kotli-V
Party	Candidate	Votes	%	±%
PML(N)	Raja Muhammad Riasat Khan	35,168	51.84	▲23.86
PPP	Chaudhry Muhammad Yasin	30,320	44.69	▲7.30
Independent	Ghafarat Shahid	1,014	1.49	
Others	Others (twelve candidates)	1,336	1.97	
Turnout		67,838	53.70	▼7.02
Total valid votes		67,838	100.00	
Rejected ballots		0	0.00	
Majority		4,848	7.15	
Registered electors		126,332		
PML(N) gain from PPP				
