= Dewan Ali Khan Chughtai =

Pakistani politician

- دیوان علی خان چغتائی

Member of the Azad Kashmir Legislative Assembly
- Incumbent
- Assumed office 3 August 2021
- Constituency: LA-33 Muzaffarabad-VII

Personal details
- Party: Pakistan People's Party (2025-present)
- Other political affiliations: Pakistan Tehreek-e-Insaf (2021-2025)

Dewan Ali Khan Chughtai (Urdu: دیوان علی خان چغتائی) is a Pakistani politician who has been a member of the Azad Kashmir Legislative Assembly since August 2021.

== Political career ==
Chughtai was elected to the Azad Kashmir Legislative Assembly from LA-33 Muzaffarabad-VII as a candidate of Pakistan Tehreek-e-Insaf (PTI) in the 2021 Azad Kashmiri general election. He received votes and defeated Raja Farooq Haider Khan, a candidate of Pakistan Muslim League (N) (PML(N)).

On 26 August 2021, he was sworn into the cabinet of Prime Minister Abdul Qayyum Khan Niazi, and was made the Minister for Elementary and Secondary Education, and Technical and Vocational Training Authority (TEVTA).

On 25 April 2022, he was sworn into the cabinet of Prime Minister Tanveer Ilyas Khan, and was made the Minister for Elementary and Secondary Education, and TEVTA.

On 25 June 2023, he was sworn into the cabinet of Prime Minister Chaudhry Anwarul Haq, and was made the Minister for Elementary and Secondary Education.

On 16 November 2025, he joined Pakistan People's Party (PPP).

On 19 November 2025, he was sworn into the cabinet of Prime Minister Faisal Mumtaz Rathore, and was made the Minister for Elementary and Secondary Education.

He was re-elected to the Assembly from LA-33 Muzaffarabad-VII as a candidate of PPP in the 2026 Azad Kashmiri general election. He received 25,469 votes, while the runner-up, Mian Muhammad Rashid of PML(N), received 21,175 votes.
