= Forestry, Wildlife & Fisheries Department, AJK =

Forestry, Wildlife & Fisheries Department - Azad Jammu and Kashmir
Agency overview
- Jurisdiction: Azad Jammu and Kashmir
- Headquarters: Muzaffarabad, AJK
- Minister responsible: Muhammad Akmal Sargala, Minister for Forests
- Agency executives: Imtiaz Ahmed, Secretary for Forests; Sardar Muhammad Naseer, Chief Conservator of Forests (Principal); Syed Gul Hussain Shah, Chief Conservator of Forests (Development)

The Forestry, Wildlife & Fisheries Department of Azad Jammu and Kashmir (AJK) is tasked with managing the natural resources found within the forested regions of AJK. The department addresses climate change and provides environmental services with the scientific and sustainable management of resources, effective watershed management to reduce sedimentation, improve environmental services, conserve biodiversity, and alleviate poverty.

The Forestry, Wildlife & Fisheries Department is led by a Minister for Forests.
