= LA-10 Kotli-III =

Constituency of the Azad Kashmir Legislative Assembly

- Constituency for the Azad Kashmir Legislative Assembly
- District: Kotli District
- Electorate: 70,533

Current constituency
- Party: Pakistan People's Party
- Member: Chaudhry Muhammad Yasin
- Created from: LA-8 Kotli-I

LA-10 Kotli-III is a constituency of Azad Kashmir Legislative Assembly which is currently represented by Chaudhry Muhammad Yasin of the Pakistan People's Party (PPP). It covers half of Kotli Tehsil in Kotli District.

== Election 2021 ==
General elections were held on 25 July 2021.

General election 2021: LA-10 Kotli-III
Party	Candidate	Votes	%	±%
PPP	Chaudhry Muhammad Yasin	9,696	21.70	
PTI	Malik Muhammad Yousaf	9,507	21.28	
Independent	Rizwan Ahmad	5,684	12.72	
PML(N)	Zubair Iqbal Kiani	3,963	8.87	
AJKMC	Muhammad Farooq Khan	3,848	8.61	
TLP	Muhammad Tasneem Azeem	3,400	7.61	
Others	Others (twenty-one candidates)	8,576	19.20	
Turnout		44,674	63.34	
Majority		189	0.42	
Registered electors		70,533		
PPP win (new seat)				

== Election 2026 ==
General elections were held on 27 July 2026. Chaudhry Muhammad Yasin of Pakistan People's Party (PPP)) won the election with 12,431 votes.

General election 2026: LA-10 Kotli-III
Party	Candidate	Votes	%	±%
PPP	Chaudhry Muhammad Yasin	12,431	44.02	▲22.32
PML(N)	Fateh Mahmood-ul-Hassan	9,246	32.74	▲23.87
Independent	Rizwan Ahmed	2,250	7.97	▼4.75
IPP	Malik Muhammad Yousaf	1,533	5.43	
Others	Others (twenty five candidates)	2,779	9.84	
Turnout		29,103	33.40	▼29.94
Total valid votes		28,239	97.03	
Rejected ballots		864	2.97	
Majority		3,185	11.28	
Registered electors		87,145		
PPP hold				
