= Chaudhry Latif Akbar =

Politician from Azad Jammu and Kashmir

- چودھری لطیف اکبر

President of Azad Kashmir
- Acting
- In office 31 January 2026 – 25 August 2026
- Prime Minister: Faisal Mumtaz Rathore
- Preceded by: Sultan Mahmood Chaudhry
- Succeeded by: Chaudhry Tariq Farooq (acting)

Speaker of the Azad Kashmir Legislative Assembly
- In office 3 June 2023 – 25 August 2026
- Deputy: Riaz Gujjar
- Preceded by: Chaudhry Anwarul Haq
- Succeeded by: Chaudhry Tariq Farooq

Leader of the Opposition Azad Kashmir Legislative Assembly
- In office 4 August 2021 – 2 June 2023
- Preceded by: Chaudhry Muhammad Yasin
- Succeeded by: Khawaja Farooq Ahmed

Member of the Azad Jammu and Kashmir Legislative Assembly
- In office 3 August 2021 – 24 August 2026
- Succeeded by: Saqib Majeed Raja
- Constituency: LA-31 Muzaffarabad-V
- In office 24 July 2006 – 30 July 2016
- Constituency: LA-27 Muzaffarabad-IV

Minister for Finance, Planning, and Development, Azad Kashmir
- In office 2 August 2011 – 30 July 2016
- Prime Minister: Chaudhry Abdul Majid

Member of the Azad Jammu and Kashmir Council
- Incumbent
- Assumed office 6 October 2026

Personal details
- Born: 4 February 1948 (age 78) Muzaffarabad, Azad Kashmir
- Party: Pakistan Peoples Party (PPP)
- Education: LL.B.
- Alma mater: University of Peshawar

Chaudhry Latif Akbar (Urdu: چوہدری لطیف اکبر) is a Pakistani politician who serves as the 14th Speaker of the Azad Jammu and Kashmir Legislative Assembly. He is a senior leader of the Pakistan Peoples Party (PPP) and has previously served as Leader of the Opposition, Minister for Finance, and as Acting President of Azad Kashmir for oath-taking duties.

== Early life and education ==
Akbar was born on 4 February 1948 in a village in Muzaffarabad District. He completed his LL.B. degree from the University of Peshawar. He began his political involvement early and became vice president of the PPP Muzaffarabad district in 1976.

== Political career ==
=== Member of the Assembly ===
Akbar entered politics in the 1970s, becoming the vice president of the PPP Muzaffarabad district in 1976. He was first elected to the Azad Jammu and Kashmir Legislative Assembly in the 1985 general elections.

He was re-elected to the Assembly from LA-27 Muzaffarabad-IV as a candidate of PPP in the 2006 Azad Kashmiri general election.

After the election, the PPP nominated him for the position of Speaker, but he was unsuccessful. He received 8 votes and was defeated by Shah Ghulam Qadir, a candidate of All Jammu and Kashmir Muslim Conference (AJKMC), who received 35 votes.

He was re-elected to the Assembly from LA-27 Muzaffarabad-IV as a candidate of PPP in the 2011 Azad Kashmiri general election.

He contested the 2016 Azad Kashmiri general election from LA-27 Muzaffarabad-IV as a candidate of PPP, but was unsuccessful.

The PPP nominated Akbar as the President of Azad Kashmir in 2016, but he was unsuccessful. He received 6 votes and was defeated by Masood Khan, a candidate of Pakistan Muslim League (N) (PML(N)).

He was re-elected to the Assembly from LA-31 Muzaffarabad-V as a candidate of PPP in the 2021 Azad Kashmiri general election. He received 22,194 votes and defeated Saqib Majeed Raja, a candidate of AJKMC.

The joint opposition consisting of PPP and PML(N) nominated Akbar as the Prime Minister of Azad Kashmir after the election, but he was unsuccessful. He received 15 votes and was defeated by Abdul Qayyum Khan Niazi, a candidate of Pakistan Tehreek-e-Insaf (PTI).

He contested the 2026 Azad Kashmiri general election from LA-31 Muzaffarabad-V as a candidate of PPP, but was unsuccessful. He received 23,957 votes and was defeated by Saqib Majeed Raja, a candidate of PML(N).

=== Ministerial roles ===
Akbar served as the Minister for Finance, Planning, and Development from 2 August 2011 to 2016.

=== Leader of the Opposition (2021–2023) ===
Akbar served as the Leader of the Opposition from August 2021 to June 2023. During the 2023 Speaker's election, he was still officially holding the position despite PPP joining the ruling coalition.

=== Speaker of the Assembly (2023–present) ===
On 3 June 2023, following the elevation of Chaudhry Anwarul Haq to Prime Minister, Akbar was elected Speaker of the Assembly with support from the PPP–PML(N) coalition, while the PTI boycotted the vote.

=== Acting President (2025, 2026) ===
In November 2025, Akbar briefly assumed the duties of Acting President of Azad Jammu and Kashmir solely to administer the oath to Prime Minister Faisal Mumtaz Rathore and his cabinet, as President Sultan Mahmood Chaudhry was unable to attend due to illness. He assumed the role again on 31 January 2026 due to the death of President Chaudhry.

=== Member of the Council ===
On 2 October 2026, he was elected unopposed to the Azad Jammu and Kashmir Council. He was sworn in on 6 October 2026.
