= Provisional constitution =

Constitution intended to serve during a transitional period

A provisional constitution, interim constitution or transitional constitution is a constitution intended to serve during a transitional period until a permanent constitution is adopted. The following countries currently have, or had in the past, such a constitution.

== Currently in force ==
- Azad Kashmir – Interim Constitution of Azad Jammu and Kashmir (since 31 August 1974)
- Libya – Libyan interim Constitutional Declaration (since 3 August 2011)
- Somalia – Provisional Constitution of the Federal Republic of Somalia (since 1 August 2012)
- South Sudan – Transitional Constitution of South Sudan (since 9 July 2011)
- Sudan – Constitutional Charter of Sudan (since 4 August 2019)
- Syria – Constitutional Declaration of the Syrian Arab Republic (since 13 March 2025)
- Taiwan – Additional Articles of the Constitution of the Republic of China (since 1 May 1991)

== In the past ==
- Czechoslovakia – Provisional Constitution (from 13 November 1918 to 6 March 1920)
- Egypt – 2011 Provisional Constitution of Egypt (from 30 March 2011 to 26 December 2012)
- Indonesia – Provisional Constitution of 1950 (from 17 August 1950 to 5 July 1959)
- Iraq – Law of Administration for the State of Iraq for the Transitional Period (from 28 June 2004 to 15 October 2005)
- Ireland – Dáil Constitution (from 21 January 1919 to 6 December 1922)
- Kosovo – Constitutional Framework for Provisional Self-Government in Kosovo (from 15 May 2001 to 16 February 2008)
- Nepal – Interim Constitution of Nepal (from 2007– 20 September 2015)
- Pakistan – Government of India Act 1935 (August 1947 to March 11)
- Philippines – 1986 Freedom Constitution (from 1986 to 1987)
- South Africa – Interim Constitution of South Africa (from 27 April 1994 to 4 February 1997)
- China – Provisional Constitution of the Republic of China (from 11 March 1912 to 1 June 1931)
- Tanzania – Interim Constitution of Tanzania (from 1964 to 1977)
- Thailand – 2006 Interim Constitution of Thailand (from 1 October 2006 to 24 August 2007)
- Thailand – 2014 Interim Constitution of Thailand (from 22 July 2014 to 6 April 2017)
- United States – Provisional Constitution (John Brown) (never in effect)
- United States – Provisional Constitution of the Confederate States (from 8 February 1861 to 22 February 1862)
