= LA-31 Muzaffarabad-V =

Constituency of the Azad Kashmir Legislative Assembly

- Constituency for the Azad Kashmir Legislative Assembly
- District: Muzaffarabad District
- Electorate: 106,580

Current constituency
- Party: Pakistan Muslim League (N)
- Member: Saqib Majeed Raja
- Created from: LA-27 Muzaffarabad-IV

LA-31 Muzaffarabad-V is a constituency of the Azad Kashmir Legislative Assembly which is currently represented by Saqib Majeed Raja of Pakistan Muslim League (N) (PML(N))). It covers some areas of Muzaffarabad Tehsil in Muzaffarabad District.

== Election 2016 ==
General elections were held on 21 July 2016.

General election 2016: LA-27 Muzaffarabad-IV
Party	Candidate	Votes	%	±%
PML(N)	Raja Muhammad Abdul Qayyum Khan	26,002		
PPP	Chaudhry Latif Akbar	17,124		
AJKMC	Saqib Majeed Raja	15,408		
APML	Arshad Hussain Shah	120		
MWM	Khalid Mehmood	101		
MQM	Syed Waqarat Hussain	41		
Turnout		58,796		

== Election 2021 ==
General elections were held on 25 July 2021.

General election 2021: LA-31 Muzaffarabad-V
Party	Candidate	Votes	%	±%
PPP	Chaudhry Latif Akbar	22,824	33.56	
AJKMC	Saqib Majeed Raja	21,481	31.58	
PTI	Raja Muhammad Mansoor Khan	9,175	13.49	
PML(N)	Raja Ibrar Hussain Khan	9,020	13.26	
TLP	Muhammad Ashraf Khan	3,950	5.81	
Others	Others (sixteen candidates)	1,565	2.30	
Turnout		68,015	63.82	
Majority		1,343	1.97	
Registered electors		106,580		
PPP gain from PML(N)				

== Election 2026 ==
Elections were held on 2 August 2026. Saqib Majeed Raja won the election with 32,511 votes.

General election 2026: LA-31 Muzaffarabad-V
Party	Candidate	Votes	%	±%
PML(N)	Saqib Majeed Raja	32,511	54.24	▲40.98
PPP	Chaudhry Latif Akbar	23,957	39.97	▲6.41
JI	Raja Aftab Ahmad Khan	1,218	2.03	
Others	Others	2,253	3.76	
Turnout		61,470	47.96	▼15.86
Total valid votes		59,939	97.51	
Rejected ballots		1,531	2.49	
Majority		8,554	14.27	
Registered electors		128,177		
PML(N) gain from PPP				
