= LA-30 Muzaffarabad-IV =

Constituency of the Azad Kashmir Legislative Assembly

- Constituency for the Azad Kashmir Legislative Assembly
- District: Muzaffarabad District; Hattian Bala District
- Electorate: 57,030

Current constituency
- Party: Pakistan Muslim League (N)
- Member: Mustafa Bashir Abbasi
- Created from: LA-26 Muzaffarabad-III; LA-28 Muzaffarabad-V; LA-29 Muzaffarabad-VI

LA-30 Muzaffarabad-IV is a constituency of the Azad Kashmir Legislative Assembly which, as of 2023, was represented by Mustafa Bashir Abbasi of the Pakistan Muslim League (N) (PML(N)). It covers some areas of Muzaffarabad Tehsil in Muzaffarabad District and some areas on Hattian Tehsil in Hattian Bala District.

== 2021 Election ==
General elections were held on 25 July 2021.

General election 2021: LA-30 Muzafarabad-IV
Party	Candidate	Votes	%	±%
PTI	Chaudhry Muhammad Rasheed	18,119	44.31	
PML(N)	Mustafa Bashir Abbasi	10,490	25.65	
PPP	Mubashir Muneer Awan	10,003	24.46	
Others	Others (four candidates)	2,278	5.57	
Turnout		40,890	71.70	
Majority		7,629	18.66	
Registered electors		57,030		
PTI win (new seat)				

== 2026 Election ==
Elections were held on 2 August 2026. Mustafa Bashir Abbasi won the election with 17,895 votes.

General election 2026: LA-30 Muzafarabad-IV
Party	Candidate	Votes	%	±%
PML(N)	Mustafa Bashir Abbasi	17,895	45.54	▲19.91
PPP	Mubasher Munir Awan Advocate	12,323	31.36	▲6.90
Independent	Shujaat Ali Shah	2,157	5.49	
Independent	Muhammad Maqbool	2,030	5.17	
Independent	Muhammad Manzor	1,947	4.96	
IPP	Abdul Jabbar Mughal	1,507	3.84	
Others	Others	1,434	3.65	
Turnout		40,229	58.97	▼12.73
Total valid votes		39,293	97.67	
Rejected ballots		936	2.33	
Majority		5,572	14.18	
Registered electors		68,225		
PML(N) gain from PTI				
