= Member of Parliament, Senate of Pakistan =

Representative of the Pakistani people in the upper house of the Pakistani Parliament

Senator Member of Senate of Pakistan
- Emblem of Pakistan
- Flag of Pakistan
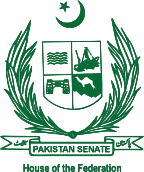
- Incumbent; Senators in the 14th Parliament of Pakistan since 12 March 2018
- Status: Active
- Abbreviation: Senator
- Member of: Senate of Pakistan
- Reports to: Chairman of the Senate of Pakistan
- Seat: Parliament of Pakistan
- Term length: 6 years; renewable
- Formation: 1973; 53 years ago
- Website: senate.gov.pk

A Member of Parliament in the Senate of Pakistan (abbreviated: MP or Senator) is the representative of the Pakistani states to one of the two houses of the Parliament of Pakistan. The National Assembly of Pakistan (Urdu: ایوانِ زیریں پاکستان, i.e. Pakistan lower house) and Senate of Pakistan (Urdu: ایوانِ بالا پاکستان, i.e. Pakistan upper house), the two houses that make up the Pakistani Parliament, are bicameral.

The total number of Senate of Pakistan's members are lower than that of the National Assembly of Pakistan's members of Parliament, and they have more limited authority and powers than the lower house (National Assembly of Pakistan). The Senate in Pakistan has 100 members, and elections for the Senate seats allotted to each province of Pakistan must be conducted using the single transferable vote under the proportional representation system.

Members of Senate of Pakistan serve six-year terms. Every three years, half of the Senate's members retire, and new ones are chosen to take their places. Membership in the Senate of Pakistan is permanent and cannot be terminated at any moment, in contrast to membership in the National Assembly of Pakistan.

== Eligibility criteria ==
To be eligible to serve as a Senator of Pakistan, a person must fulfill each of the following requirements:

- A citizen of Pakistan
- 30 years of age
- A registered voter in the region or province where the person intends to run for office.
- Should meet the qualifications prescribed under Article 62 of the Constitution of Pakistan.

== Disqualifications ==
A person wouldn't be qualified to serve as a Senator of Pakistan if:

Holds any position under the Pakistani government, other than an office permitted by Parliament of Pakistan by law.

- Is mentally unstable.
- An unsatisfied insolvent.
- Lost his/her Pakistani citizenship.
- Is prohibited from doing so by any law passed by the Pakistani Parliament.
- Is therefore disqualified due to desertion.
- Has, among other things, been found guilty of inciting animosity amongst various groups.
- Has a record of bribery convictions.
- Has received punishment for advocating and engaging in social offences such sati, dowry, and untouchability.
- Has received a prison sentence after being found guilty of a crime.
- Has been fired due to corruption charges or state disloyalty (in case of a government servant).

== Term ==
The term of the member of the Senate of Pakistan is six years, however it is not subject to dissolution. Every three years, half of the Senate's members retire, and new ones are chosen to take their places.

== Role ==
The role of a Senator in the Senator of Pakistan:

- Represent their state, region or province viewpoints in the Senate of Pakistan.
- Examine the government's work closely.
- Introduce legislation and discussion on it.
- Analyze information on specific subjects or legislation for Senate Committees from community organizations, lobbying groups, and the general public.
- Submitting petitions.
- Make suggestions regarding the financial bill.

== Members of the Senate of Pakistan ==
Party	Seats	Party	Seats
PPP	26	JI	1
PML (N)	27	NP	3
MQM	8	PkMAP	3
PTI	7	BNP-A	2
ANP	6	PML (F)	1
JUI (F)	5	BNP	1
PML (Q)	4	Independents	10

== See also ==
- Member of Parliament, National Assembly of Pakistan
- Parliament of Pakistan
