= Khalid Ibrahim Khan =

Politician

Sardar Khalid Ibrahim Khan
- سردار خالد ابراہیم خان

Personal details
- Born: 5 November 1947 Rawalakot, Azad Kashmir
- Died: 4 November 2018 (aged 70) Islamabad, Pakistan
- Party: Jammu Kashmir Peoples Party
- Relations: Sardar Muhammad Ibrahim Khan (Founder president of Azad Kashmir) (Father); Masood Khan (President of Azad Kashmir in 2021) (Cousin)
- Profession: Politician

Sardar Khalid Ibrahim Khan (5 November 1948 – 4 November 2018) was a Kashmiri politician. He was a member of AJK legislative assembly and the President of Jammu Kashmir Peoples Party.

He was the son of the founder and first president of Azad Kashmir, Sardar Muhammad Ibrahim Khan.

== Early life and career ==
Khalid Ibrahim Khan was born on 5 November 1948 in Kot Mattay Khan near Rawalakot. His family belongs to the Sudhan tribe. Khalid started his political career affiliated with Pakistan Peoples Party in the late 1970s. He was known to be a straightforward and candid person and did not shy away from having differences with the top leadership of his political party, including with Benazir Bhutto. At times, he paid a political price for it by being ignored by the party's top leadership. As a result, he and his supporters formed their own party by the name of Jammu and Kashmir Peoples Party to contest elections.

== Death ==
Khan died on 4 November 2018, aged 69 from a brain hemorrhage. Among the survivors were his wife, two sons and two daughters.
