= High Court of Azad Jammu and Kashmir =

Courts of Kashmir

- عدالتِ عالیہ آزاد آزاد جموں و کشمیر
- Established: May 18, 1948
- Jurisdiction: Azad Jammu and Kashmir
- Location: Principal Seat: Muzaffarabad; Circuit Benches: Kotli, Mirpur & Rawalakot
- Authorised by: Section 43, Azad Jammu and Kashmir Interim Constitution Act 1974
- Appeals to: Supreme Court of Azad Jammu and Kashmir
- Appeals from: District Courts of Azad Jammu and Kashmir
- Number of positions: Nine
- Website: www.ajkhighcourt.gok.pk

Chief Justice
- Currently: Sadaqat Hussain Raja

The High Court of Azad Jammu and Kashmir (commonly known as Azad Kashmir High Court) is an appellate court in Muzaffarabad, Azad Jammu and Kashmir. It hears appeals against decisions of the District Courts of Azad Kashmir. The court has three circuit benches based in Kotli, Mirpur, and Rawalakot.

In 2016, Sardar Muhammad Yaqoob Khan, president of Azad Kashmir appointed Raja Sadaqat Hussain as a permanent judge of the High Court of Azad Jammu and Kashmir in consultation with the High Court chief justice and on the advice of the Kashmir Council.

== See also ==
- Supreme Court of Azad Jammu and Kashmir
