= Supreme Court of Azad Jammu and Kashmir =

Courts of Pakistan

Supreme Court of Azad Jammu & Kashmir
- عدالتِ عظمیٰ آزاد جموں و کشمیر
- Jurisdiction: Azad Jammu and Kashmir
- Authorised by: AJK Interim Constitution Act, 1974
- Appeals from: High Court of Azad Jammu and Kashmir
- Number of positions: 3
- Website: ajksupremecourt.gok.pk

Chief Justice
- Currently: Raja Saeed Akram Khan
- Since: 1 April 2020

The Supreme Court of Azad Jammu and Kashmir is the highest court of appeal in Azad Jammu and Kashmir. It consists of a Chief Justice and two other Judges.

The number of judges in the ‘Supreme Court has been fixed at three by the ‘‘AJK’’ Interim Constitution Act, 1974. Per this constitution, the judges are appointed by the President of Azad Jammu and Kashmir on the advice of the prime minister of Pakistan.

In April 2020, Raja Saeed Akram Khan was the acting Chief Justice of Azad Jammu and Kashmir Supreme Court who took oath from the president of Azad Jammu and Kashmir Masood Khan.

== Court composition ==
The judge of the Supreme Court retires at the age of 65, unless resigning sooner or being removed from office, or records written reasons for deviating from this rule in accordance with the Interim Constitution of Azad Jammu and Kashmir (1974). By the amendment of AJK Constitution in 1993, the number of judges at the court is fixed at 3, including the Chief Justice. There is one ad hoc judge of the court.

=== Chief Justice of AJK and justices ===
Having been appointed on May 18, 2021, Raja Saeed Akram Khan is currently serving as Chief Justice of AJK. According to seniority, the Supreme Court currently consists of the two regular judges listed below, along with the Chief Justice, and one ad hoc judge.

Justices of the Supreme Court of AJK

Order	Name	Appointment	Retirement	Court of precedence	Notes
1	Justice Raja Saeed Akram Khan	18 May 2021	10 March 2027	Islamabad High Court	
2	Justice Khawaja Muhammad Nasim	26 May 2021	30 September 2025		
3	Justice Raza Ali Khan	26 May 2021	3 July 2034		

Ad hoc appointments

Order	Name	Appointments	Retirement	Court of Precedence	Note
1	Justice Masood A. Sheikh	13 March 2024 ^{(Ad hoc)}			

== Jurisdiction ==
A challenge from any judgement, decree, final decision, or sentence of the High Court of Azad Jammu and Kashmir may be made to the Supreme Court of Azad Jammu and Kashmir under Section 42(11) of the AJ&K Interim Constitution Act, 1974. Similar to the Supreme Court, an appeal is also available from the ruling issued by the Azad Jammu and Kashmir Shariat Court pursuant to the Islamic Penal Laws Act, Shariat Court Act, and other Islamic Penal Laws.

If the Supreme Court grants leave to appeal, any judgment, decree, order, or sentence of the High Court may be appealed to the Supreme Court in situations where Section 42(11) is not applicable. In a similar manner, under Section 47(3) of the Interim Constitution Act, an appeal may be made to the Supreme Court from a decision made by an administrative court or tribunal if it involves a material issue of law that is of public importance and the Supreme Court grants leave to appeal.

The AJ&K Interim Constitution Act, 1974 does not contain a clause similar to Article 184(3) of the Islamic Republic of Pakistan, 1973 Constitution that grants the Supreme Court of Pakistan original jurisdiction. As the board of judicial advisors and judicial board formerly were, the Supreme Court of Azad Jammu and Kashmir now simply serves as the appellate court. Except in an appeal, it cannot consider any direct petitions or issue any orders. Its advisory authority under Section 46-A of the Interim Constitution Act is the only original jurisdiction it has. The Supreme Court of Azad Jammu and Kashmir has equal and identical appellate authority to the Supreme Court of Pakistan.

== See also ==
- High Court of Azad Jammu & Kashmir
