= Jammu Kashmir Peoples Party =

Political party in Azad Kashmir

- Abbreviation: JKPP
- President: Sardar Hassan Ibrahim Khan
- Secretary General: Sheikh Javed Iftar
- Chief Organizer: Sardar Tasleem Baghi
- Founder: Sardar Muhammad Ibrahim Khan
- Founded: 19 July 1990 (36 years ago)
- Headquarters: Islamabad
- Student wing: Jammu Kashmir Peoples Student Organization (JKPSO)
- Youth wing: Jammu Kashmir Peoples Youth Council (JKPYC)
- Ideology: Pakistani nationalism Kashmiri nationalism Islamic democracy Regionalism
- Regional affiliation: All Parties Hurriyat Conference
- Colors: Green, white and red
- Slogan: Nothing But Truth
- AJK Assembly: 0 / 53

Election symbol
- Sword

Party flag
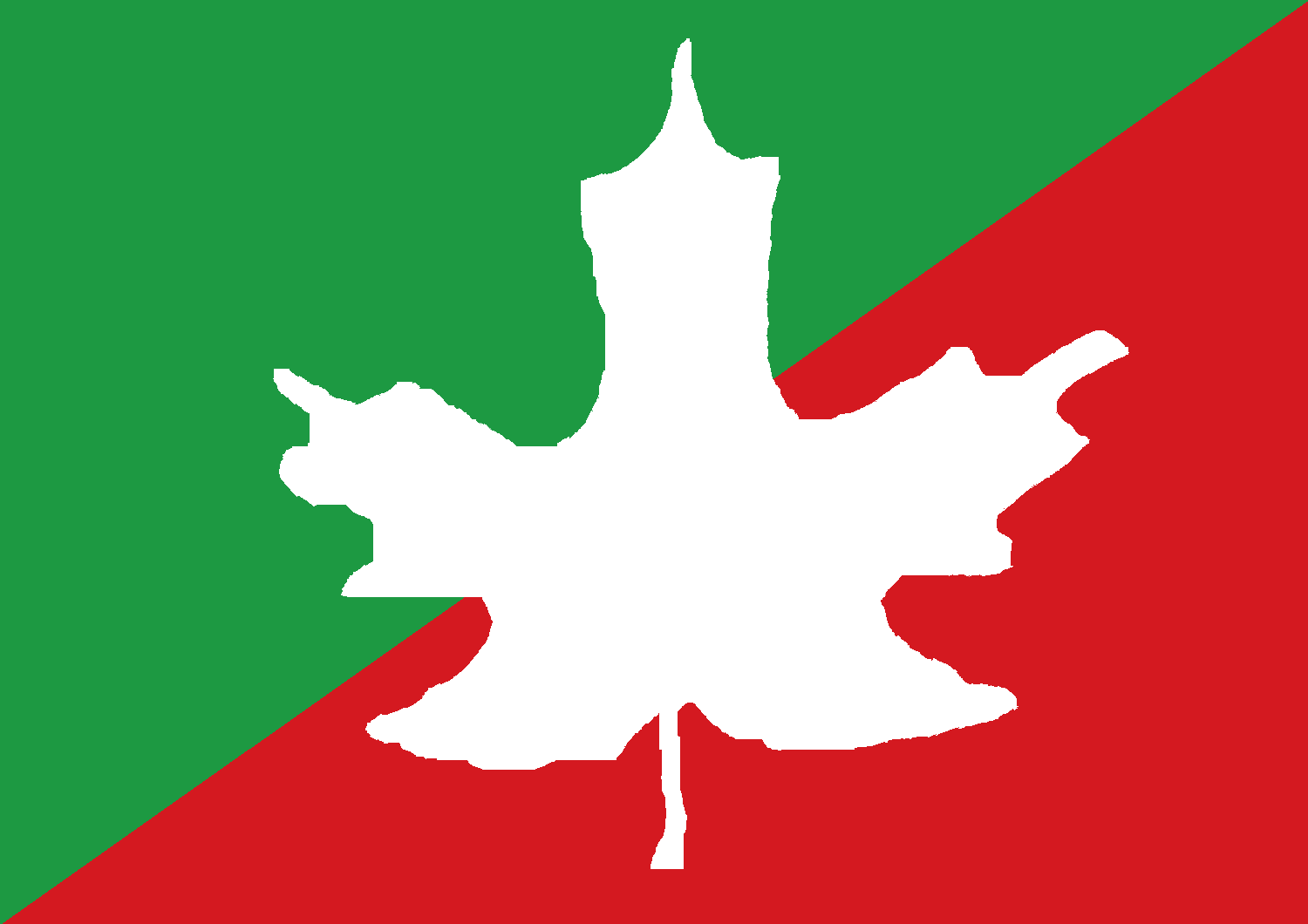

Jammu Kashmir Peoples Party (JKPP) is a political party of the self-governing state, Azad Kashmir located in Pakistan administered Kashmir which aims to give the democratic rights to the Kashmiris over their homeland and believes in more Self determination rights of Jammu and Kashmir.

The region is divided amongst three countries in a territorial dispute: Pakistan controls the northwest portion (Northern Areas and Kashmir), India controls the central and southern portion (Jammu and Kashmir) and Ladakh, and the People's Republic of China controls the northeastern portion (Aksai Chin and the Trans-Karakoram Tract). The main center of politics of the JKPP is Azad Kashmir.

== Founding ==
Jammu Kashmir Peoples Party was formed on 19 July 1990, after observing the changes in political situation of Azad Kashmir, by politicians of the same school of thought, under the supervision of the founder of Azad Kashmir, Sardar Muhammad Ibrahim Khan. In 1947 he led the war of independence against Dogra rule to win independence. The purpose of JKPP's formation was to provide a platform to the people, through which they can struggle for independence and betterment of the society.

== First convention ==
The first convention of Jammu Kashmir Peoples Party was held in Islamabad on 9 December 1992. Keeping the democratic principles in mind, the Central Council of 200 members elected the first president of the party. Since then, the party officially started its working.

== 2005 earthquake ==
For Pakistanis, the earthquake of October 8, 2005 became a symbol of sympathy and assistance to others in their misery and sorrow. The government agencies were unable to handle this disaster, which was too massive for any single government or agency to tackle alone. It was the participation of the people, en masse, which enabled the government and all its wings to bear the heavy burden. Jammu Kashmir Peoples Party, and other social, political and religious personalities and organisations contributed for earthquake victims.

== See also ==
- Jammu Kashmir Liberation Front
- All Jammu and Kashmir Muslim Conference
- Jammu & Kashmir Ittihadul Muslimeen
