= Iftikhar Gilani =

Pakistani politician

Syed Iftikhar Ali Gilani
- سید افتخار علی گیلانی

Prime Minister of Azad Kashmir
- Incumbent
- Assumed office 28 August 2026
- President: Chaudhry Tariq Farooq (Acting); Muhammad Najeeb Naqi Khan
- Preceded by: Faisal Mumtaz Rathore

Member of the Azad Kashmir Legislative Assembly
- Incumbent
- Assumed office 24 August 2026
- Constituency: Reserved seat for technocrats
- In office October 2011 – 3 August 2021
- Preceded by: Muhammad Hanif Awan
- Constituency: LA-26 Muzaffarabad-III

Personal details
- Born: 27 July 1980 (age 46) Muzaffarabad, Azad Kashmir, Pakistan
- Party: Pakistan Muslim League (N)

Syed Iftikhar Ali Gilani (Urdu: سید افتخار علی گیلانی) is a Pakistani politician and current Prime Minister of Azad Kashmir since 28 August 2026. He is a member of the Azad Kashmir Legislative Assembly since August 2026 and previously from October 2011 to August 2021.

== Early life and education ==
Born in Muzaffarabad, Azad Kashmir on July 27, 1980, Gilani is the eldest of four siblings, and belongs to a family that has been involved philanthropic work, trade and transport, as well politics, as his father Syed Asif Ali Gillani was close to Raja Mumtaz Hussain Rathore, the former Prime Minister of Azad Kashmir. Gilani completed his early schooling in Islamabad before moving to London, earning a bachelor's degree from SOAS University of London. He was called to the bar at Lincoln's Inn in 2005 and began practicing law in Islamabad in 2006.

== Political career ==
Gilani was elected to the Azad Kashmir Legislative Assembly from LA-26 Muzaffarabad-III as a candidate of Pakistan Muslim League (N) (PML(N)) in a September 2011 by-election. He received 22,691 votes and defeated Usman Attique, a candidate of All Jammu and Kashmir Muslim Conference, who was also supported by Pakistan People's Party (PPP).

He was re-elected to the Assembly from LA-26 Muzaffarabad-III as a candidate of PML(N) in the 2016 Azad Kashmiri general election. He received 20,506 votes and defeated Khawaja Farooq Ahmed, a candidate of Pakistan Tehreek-e-Insaf (PTI).

On 6 August 2016, he was sworn into the cabinet of Prime Minister Raja Farooq Haider Khan, and was made the Minister for Higher, Elementary, and Secondary Education and Muzaffarabad City Development Project. After a cabinet re-shuffle on 7 November 2018, he was additionally assigned the portfolio of Environment.

He contested the 2021 Azad Kashmiri general election from LA-29 Muzaffarabad-III as a candidate of PML(N), but was unsuccessful. He received 10,557 votes and was defeated by Khawaja Farooq Ahmed, a candidate of PTI.

He was re-elected to the Assembly from a reserved seat for technocrats in the 2026 Azad Kashmiri general election as a candidate of the PML(N). In the same election, he contested from LA-29 Muzaffarabad-III as a candidate of PML(N), but was unsuccessful. He received 16,413 votes and was defeated by Mukhtar Ahmad Khan Abbasi, a candidate of Pakistan People's Party (PPP).

Nawaz Sharif, the president of the PML (N), nominated Gilani as the party's candidate for the office of Prime Minister of Azad Kashmir. His nomination was opposed by some senior PML-N leaders in Azad Kashmir, including Shah Ghulam Qadir and former prime minister Raja Farooq Haider.

On 28 August 2026, he was elected as Prime Minister, receiving 30 votes, and defeating Mukhtar Ahmad Khan Abbasi of PPP, who received 14 votes. On the same day, he was administered the oath of office by Speaker Chaudhry Tariq Farooq, who was serving as acting President.
