= Saddar Bazaar =

Term for retail markets in cantonments of India and Pakistan

Saddar Bazaar (lit. 'Central Bazaar') is usually the main market or bazaar in most of the cantonments of India and Pakistan.

== Meanings and derivation ==
The word Saddar is derived from Arabic which means, the 'chest', 'center' or 'main'. Owing to this derivation, it means the Central or Main bazaar. During the British Raj in South Asia, a number of Garrisons were established throughout India and Pakistan. Most of these cantonments, especially in Punjab region had one, two or three of the following bazaars:

- Saddar Bazaar.
- R A Bazaar i.e., Royal Artillery Bazaar.
- Lal Kurti Bazaar i.e., Lalkurti meaning Red Shirts; derived from Redcoat, the uniform formerly worn by many soldiers in the British Army, and a name used for the soldiers themselves.

== Saddar bazaars in Pakistan ==
Following important cantonments or cities of Pakistan have Saddar Bazaars;

- Lahore Cantonment
- Karachi Cantonment
- Rawalpindi Cantonment
- Multan Cantonment
- Sialkot Cantonment
- Peshawar Cantonment
- Jhang Cantonment

== Administration and control ==
Saddar bazaars are usually controlled by respective Cantonment Boards which are in turn under the administrative control of Station Headquarters.

== See also ==
- Saddar, Karachi, Pakistan
- Saddar, Rawalpindi
- Saddar (Hyderabad), Pakistan
- Sadar Bazaar, Agra, India
- Sadar Bazaar, Delhi, India
- Sadar Bazar Jhansi, India
