= Krishna Temple, Rawalpindi =

Hindu temple in Rawalpindi, Pakistan

Shri Krishna Mandir, Rawalpindi
- شری کرشنا مندر
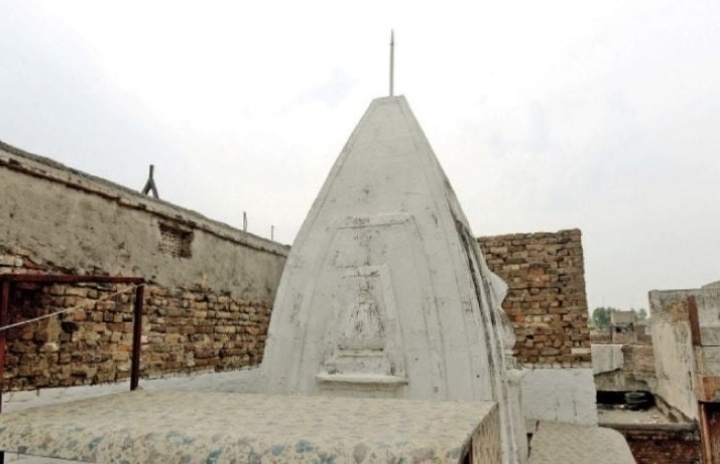
- Shikhara of Shri Krishna Mandir Rawalpindi

Religion
- Affiliation: Hinduism
- District: Rawalpindi District
- Province: Punjab
- Deity: Krishna
- Festivals: Janmashtami, Diwali, Holi
- Governing body: Evacuee Trust Property Board
- Status: Open

Location
- Location: Rawalpindi
- Country: Pakistan
- Interactive map of Shri Krishna Mandir, Rawalpindi
- Coordinates: 33.6018°N 73.0525°E

Architecture
- Type: Hindu temple
- Creator: Kanji Mal and Ujagar Mal Ram Rachpal
- Established: British Raj 1897; 129 years ago
- Site area: 101 m^{2} (1,090 sq ft)

The Shri Krishna mandir (Urdu: شری کرشنا مندر), or the Krishna Temple, is a Hindu temple located in Rawalpindi in the Punjab province of Pakistan. It is situated between the Rawalpindi railway station and Kabari Bazaar in Saddar. It is one of the 3 main Hindu temple in the Rawalpindi district, others being Lal Kurti Temple and the Valmik Swamiji Mandir in Gracy lines. It is a place of worship for the approximately 7,000 Hindus living in Rawalpindi and Islamabad, with the other handful of temples being non-functional. It is listed as a Religious and Spiritual Tourism site by the Tourism Development Corporation of Punjab.

It covers an area of less than 4 marlas (around 101 m^{2}). The courtyard of the double storey building has a capacity to accommodate around 100 worshippers.

== History ==
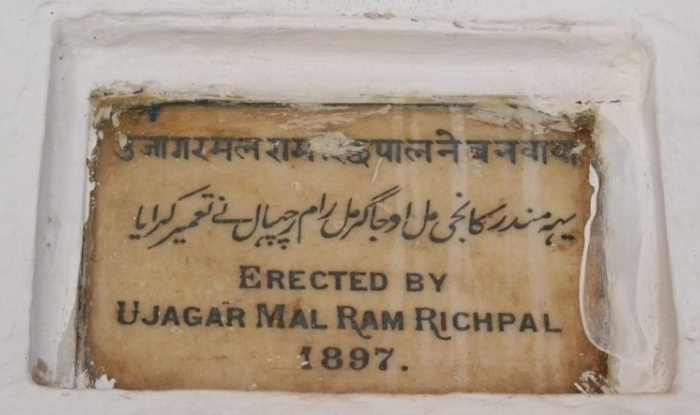
The foundation plaque mentioning Kanji Mal and Ujagar Mal Ram Rachpal as the founders of the temple in British Raj era 1897

The Krishna temple was built during the British Raj by brothers Kanji Mal and Ujagar Mal Ram Rachpal, two wealthy businessmen of Saddar, in 1897 as a place of worship for the Hindus living in the surrounding areas. From 1947 to 1948 it was closed to avoid religious violence that followed the partition. It was reopened in 1949 and was handed over to the local Hindu Punchayat for those Hindus who chose to remain in Pakistan and it became the main place of worship for Rawalpindi Hindus.

In 1970, the temple was taken over by the Evacuee Trust Property Board, which leased the area surrounding it to local traders. The Hindu community has been protesting against this occupation of the temple land. The temple was frequented by diplomats living in Islamabad until the 1980s.

It serves as the main temple for the estimated 50 Hindu families residing in the city, with two prayers held daily. It is also frequented by Hindus visiting from Sindh.

== Renovation ==
In 2018, the Punjab government released Rs. 20 million to renovate the temple. The renovation and restoration was completed in 2020. In 2025, the temple was handed over to Evacuee Trust Property Board for renovation costing Rs.40 million. The rebuilding project covers halls, rooms, washrooms, and other sections of the structure.

== Festival ==
Hindu festivals like Holi and Diwali are celebrated here.

== See also ==
- List of Hindu temples in Pakistan
