= G. K. Reddy =

Indian journalist

Gunupati Keshava Reddy (1923–1987), better known as G. K. Reddy, was an Indian journalist who attained national and international acclaim for his articles and news stories. He was a major contributor to the newspaper The Hindu for more than two decades, becoming a household name with his front-page articles every day. Reddy was also involved in the nascent Kashmir conflict in the early years of his career, working for a Kashmiri newspaper in Srinagar and later the Azad Kashmir provisional government.

The G. K. Reddy National Memorial Award for Journalism is given in his memory.

== Early life ==
Reddy was born in Nellore, Madras Presidency (now in Andhra Pradesh), in British India in 1923. He was of Telugu origin.

== Career ==
=== Kashmir and Pakistan ===
Reddy's journalistic career began as the editor of the newspaper Kashmir Times in the then princely state of Jammu and Kashmir in the 1940s. Reddy also served as the correspondent for the Associated Press of India in Srinagar, reporting to its Lahore chief Malik Tajuddin. Kashmir Times, owned and published by Abdul Rahman Mittha in Srinagar, (Note: Mitha is said to have been a native of Bombay, the son of its former mayor Suleman Qasim Mitha.) advocated accession of the state to the Dominion of Pakistan. Reddy's coverage of the events in Kashmir was highly prized in Pakistan and regularly reported on Radio Pakistan in Lahore.

By 7 October 1947, the Government of Maharaja Hari Singh imposed rigorous press censorship in the state and told Kashmir Times to cease the publication of accession matters. The newspaper suspended publication in protest. Reddy was detained at Domel near Muzaffarabad for 10 days in mid-October. After that, he was transported to Kathua under military escort and expelled from the state at the Pathankot border. Mitha was also externed at the same time and sent to Pakistan, where he worked with the Muslim Conference leader Sardar Ibrahim leading a rebellion against the Maharaja's government.

Reddy went to Lahore, Pakistan, by 19 October, to work for the Associated Press of India, which was still a united agency across India and Pakistan (but would later split into the Associated Press of India and the Associated Press of Pakistan). Reddy was incensed with the treatment of Muslims by the Maharaja's government. On 26 October, he gave a detailed interview to the Lahore-based daily Civil & Military Gazette, where he described the `mad orgy of Dogra violence' against unarmed Muslims in the Jammu province.

While in Lahore, on 21 October 1947, Reddy received a phone call from Lt. Col. Alavi, the Public Relations Officer of the Pakistan Army headquarters in Rawalpindi, stating that the Ramkot post of Kashmir was being attacked that night and the news should be published as coming from the Azad Kashmir Headquarters in Palandri. He was also told that all further news of the invasion would come from the Rawalpindi headquarters and the practice of a Palandri dateline should be maintained.

He was subsequently forced into the position of Director of Public Relations for the rebel forces in Kashmir and only managed to escape seven months later. Sardar Ibrahim was proclaimed as the head of a provisional government of Azad Kashmir on 24 October, with nominal headquarters at Palandri but real operations based in Rawalpindi. Mitha and Reddy worked with the new government to create press releases. They stayed at the 'Poonch House' in Rawalpindi. (Note: The 'Poonch House' was one of the palaces of the Maharaja of Jammu and Kashmir, which was apparently usurped by Pakistan.) They were also close to the Chief Minister Abdul Qayyum Khan of the Northwest Frontier Province, and acted as press advisors to him as well. At some point, Reddy is believed to have been interned by Pakistani authorities who regarded him as a spy. He escaped to India in 1948, and the evidence he carried with him of the US and Pakistani involvement in the invasion of Kashmir was published in the weekly Blitz in a series of articles starting 9 June 1948, causing a national and international sensation.

=== India ===
Reddy worked for the Blitz from 1948 to 1951, writing incisive articles that put him up against the Government authorities. His journalistic accreditation was cancelled twice by the authorities due to his irksome coverage. While at Blitz, Reddy also wrote a "Delhi Daily" column with humorous coverage of Delhi's developments, which used to rock the capital into splits of laughter. B. K. Karanjia mentions that Reddy's output from Delhi was so prolific that they had to sometimes produce mid-week editions of Blitz.

In 1951, Reddy became the foreign correspondent to The Times of India. He reported from various locations such as Korea, Beijing, Taipei, Bandung and London. His lively "Letter from London" was published in The Times of India every week. In 1962, he returned to Delhi to become the chief of the news bureau, and is said to have taken up political reporting with "panache".

In 1969, Reddy moved to The Hindu as its chief of news bureau in Delhi, a position that he developed into one of "considerable power and prestige." He was widely read, and enjoyed the confidence of many in the corridors of power. According to Inder Malhotra, "he made it his business to explain every complexity with clarity." President Neelam Sanjiva Reddy summed up the nation's feelings in the words, "G.K. Reddy's rich experience mellowed his political reporting and analysis so much so that his byline meant authenticity, in depth reporting, an eye for detail and above all fairness and balance."

== Honours ==
- He was the recipient of a Fellowship from Nieman Foundation for Journalism in 1957.
- He was awarded Honorary Doctorate by Andhra University and Sri Venkateswara University.
- He was awarded the Raja-Lakshmi Award in 1986 by Sri Raja-Lakshmi Foundation Chennai.

== Death and memorial ==
Reddy died of cancer in 1987 in New York City.

=== Memorial award ===
In his memory, the G.K. Reddy Memorial National Award for journalism was established by T. Subbarami Reddy, whose recipients over the years include:

- Prabhu Chawla, Editor-in-Chief of the New Indian Express,
- H. K. Dua, former Editor-in-Chief of the Hindustan Times,
- Aroon Purie, Editor-in-Chief of the India Today magazine,
- Shekhar Gupta, former Editor-in-Chief of the Indian Express,
- N. Ravi, Editor-in-Chief of The Hindu,
- Vinod Mehta, Editorial Chairman of the Outlook
- Karan Thapar in 2018, Senior journalist and television presenter.

== Bibliography ==
- Bhagyalakshmi, J., ed. (1991), Capital Witness: Selected Writings of G. K. Reddy, New Delhi: Allied Publishers, ISBN 9788170233169 – via archive.org
- Rao, R. Ananta Padmanabha (2000), G. K. Reddy, Dhilli Andhra Pramukhulu (in Telugu), Hyderabad: Potti Sriramulu Telugu University
- Snedden, Christopher (2013), Kashmir: The Unwritten History, HarperCollins India, pp. 51–52, ISBN 978-9350298985
