= Rechargeable calling card =

Type of telephone card

A rechargeable calling card or a recharge card is a type of telephone card that the user can "recharge" or "top up" by adding money when the balance gets below a nominated amount. In reality, the rechargeable calling card is a specialised form of a prepaid or debit account.

To use the phone card, the user would call an access number (which is usually a toll-free telephone number), enter the "card number" (also called the PIN) and then dial the desired telephone number. The user could add value to the card at the same time as making a call. When travelling, the user has a list of access numbers for various countries, enabling them to call from any phone in most countries and be able to top-up the card.

The so-called rechargeable calling card is merely a marketing device, but it is convenient to many users because it is a durable credit card size card. In reality, the system works by a user being provided with a unique "card ID" (the PIN). After transferring funds to the card company, the ID can be provided electronically by email, by SMS, over the internet, a coupon printed by a cash register at a store, or any other way. Also, as the card balance is actually recorded on the card company's database, topping up can be effected in any manner that funds can be transferred to the company.

== History ==
Calling cards were introduced in Italy in 1977 and became especially popular in Japan when they were introduced there in 1982. These cards had a set value that could be spent, and once the credit was used, the card would be discarded. Calling cards began to gain popularity around the world and they turned into a multimillion-dollar industry.

In an attempt to improve the phone card, companies started issuing rechargeable calling cards in the early 1990s, also obtainable over the internet, which became the most common phone card on the market.

== Recharging ==
Cards can be recharged or topped up in a variety of ways:

- Credit card
- Cash at convenience stores/corner shops
- Swipe card machines
- Internet
- Coupons
- Bank account
- Debit card

== Japan ==
Even though the calling card was first introduced in Italy the country that took to the calling card most was Japan, where calling cards were introduced in 1982 by Nippon Telegraph and Telephone (NTT). It was an instant hit, selling thousands a day on the subway systems in Tokyo and Osaka, various other companies began to get involved and released their variants. In 2000, Brastel Telecom released the first rechargeable phone card in Japan called Brastel Card; this time, the card was sold in convenience stores across Japan. As the rechargeable phone card took off, more companies began to release cards.

== A cardless future ==
As international travel became cheaper and more people started to travel, the international phone card became an essential part of a travelers` itinerary, previously customers would have to carry one or more cards when traveling, and the cards could only be used on certain phones. Phone companies such as Pure Minutes began to release "cardless" phone cards; instead of being issued with a real card, the user will be given a list of access numbers for various countries and a pin which they can use to log into their account. This allowed people to call from any phone in any country and still be able to top up their credit.

== Sources ==
- Chicago Tribune 1995 Calling Cards
- Newspaper Article about Rechargeable Calling Cards
- College Article
- Buzzle Article Detailing the Rechargeable Calling Card
