= Chik Bazaar =

Bazaar in Rawalpindi, Punjab, Pakistan

Chik Bazaar located in Saddar, Rawalpindi, Pakistan چک بازار
- Bazaar for handcrafred window curtains and blinds made from bamboo cane
- Country: Pakistan
- Province: Punjab
- City: Rawalpindi

Chik Bazaar (Urdu: چک بازار) is a bazaar located in Rawalpindi, Pakistan.

This bazaar is also known as 'Chikon Wali Gali' (Chik Street) in local language and is one of the oldest markets in Rawalpindi region.

== Specialty bazaar ==
This bazaar is known for traditional cane and bamboo window curtains and blinds for homes, bamboo sticks and other handicrafts. These window blinds, made from soft canes, are stitched together to make all kinds of sizes or are custom-made to the customer's wishes. It is a common perception in Pakistan that these Chiks keep the temperature of a room cool during hot summers. Apart from Pakistan, people from other countries also contact the artisans of this market to make handicrafts for them.

"The best thing about Potohar region is that it produces the best canes, known as Surkanday in local language. They grow near water streams and small rivers. This might be the reason why Chiks are popular in this region".

"The design and use of chiks has changed with time. Now people use it more to decorate their interiors".
