= Brastel Telecom =

Telecommunication company in Tokyo, Japan

- Type: Public
- Industry: Telecommunications
- Founded: 1996 (privatized)
- Headquarters: Ryogoku, Sumida‐ku, Tokyo, Japan
- Key people: Junji Tanabe, CEO; Kendi Kawai CEO
- Revenue: 6.2 billion yen JPY (August 2009)
- Number of employees: 213 (November 2009)
- Subsidiaries: ZIP Telecom Inc., Tupiniquim Entertainment Co., Ltd., Brastel Inc. (USA), Brastel Brasil Participações Ltda. (Brazil)
- Website: Brastel.com

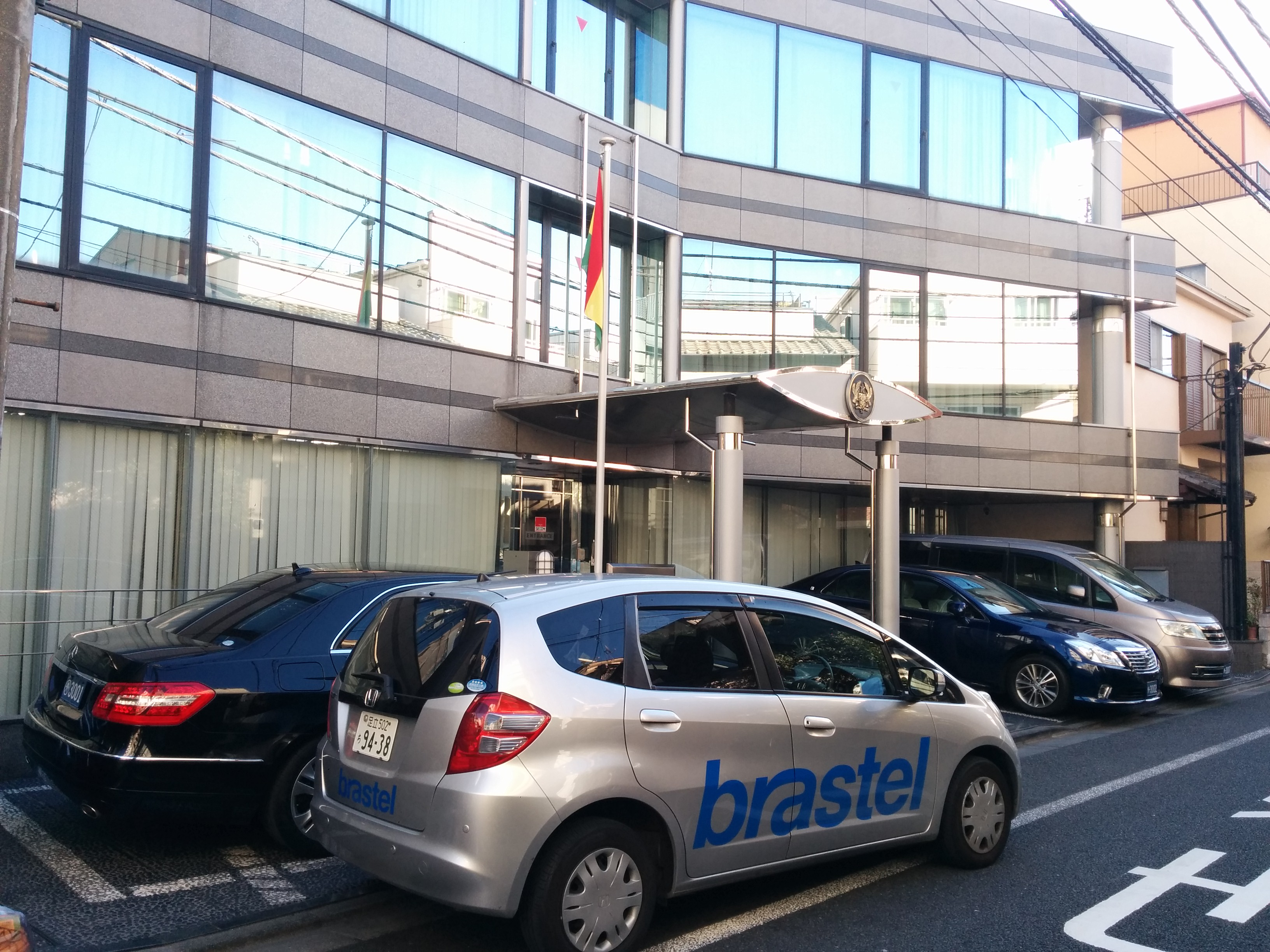
Brastel car parked at Ghana embassy in Tokyo

Brastel Telecom, popularly known as Brastel is a Japanese telecommunication company based in Tokyo. They distribute international prepaid calling cards within Japan and Asia via convenience stores. Brastel's largest target demographic is Brazilian ex-pats living in Japan.

The company was started in 1996, originally selling callback services. In 2000 they released the first rechargeable calling card in Japan. This product quickly became Brastel's biggest source of income. Recently they have started to invest in IP phone technology through their FLiP and Basix services.

They are also noted for their philanthropic work in Brazilian communities as well as for their involvement in the building of schools and for providing seminars and lectures for poor and disadvantaged communities around the world.

The promotion of Brazilian culture in Japan has played a prominent part of Brastel since the creation of sub company Tupiniquim Entertainment in 2005.

== History ==
=== Early history (1996-2000) ===
Brastel Telecom was formed in 1996 by Junji Tanabe and Kendi Kawai, and primarily provided callback system services to the Brazilian community in Japan. In 1998, an agreement with KDDI (formally KDD) allowed the company to acquire international connections from Japan. In 2000 Brastel released a rechargeable prepaid calling card called Brastel Card (formally Brastel Smartphone Card) that was available for free in convenience stores, ethnic shops, restaurants, and bars throughout Japan. Shortly after they introduced a paperless recharge system, Smart Pit, developed by NTT Comware, which utilized a bar code printed on the back of the card that allowed for payment without coupons.

=== Expansion (2002-2005) ===
In 2002 Brastel entered into agreements to use the Japanese PSTN (Public Switched Telephone Network), which is controlled by the major carriers in Japan. This allowed the company to acquire connections within Japanese territory, making it possible for them to start offering their own direct prefix numbers. Shortly after, Brastel entered the American market, promoting its services in California, USA, targeting the Latino and Japanese communities.

=== The Internet Age (2006-2016) ===
In 2006 broadband internet became the standard for home-based internet connections. Increased bandwidth allowed free calling services such as Skype, Google Talk and iChat to emerge. To deal with this new form of communication, Brastel diverged into new areas: investing in online Live Support (Japan-only, launched in October), and providing customers with real-time assistance over the internet in both English and Japanese. During the same year they opened an office in São Paulo, Brazil.

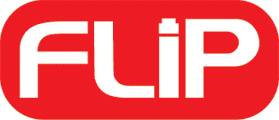
Flip Logo

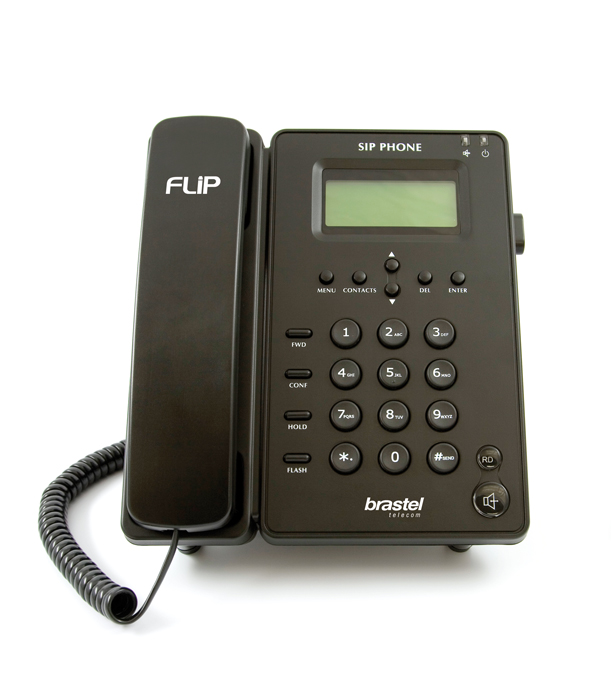
Flip phone

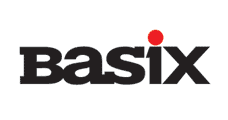
Basix logo

In January 2007, Brastel launched the FLiP service, an IP phone that allowed customers to call domestic and international phones via the internet. Three months later, they launched Basix, an IP phone service designed for medium and small sized companies based on the ASP system. While FLiP was intended for the home user, Basix was intended for use by companies looking to replace or buy a PBX system.

== Culture ==
In 2005, Brastel created a new cultural division, Tupiniquim Entertainment. The division primarily focused on Brazilian culture. Tupiniquim Entertainment's main event is the Festival Cinema Brasil, a yearly event that showcases films from Brazil. This cultural division has invited several musicians from Brazil to perform in Japan.

== Corporate culture ==
Brastel has a unique working culture, especially considering that it is a Japanese company. Within the work environment, employees are not required to wear a suit or tie, and there are at least three languages spoken: Portuguese, Japanese and English. This is in addition to the other languages spoken by employees of the company, who are of fifteen or more nationalities. Due to the large Brazilian work force, many aspects of the company are tailored for Brazilians, including a Brazilian lorry arriving twice a week with Brazilian foods and goods. The employees can also order a Brazilian bento every day which is delivered directly to the company.

In previous years the company has held an international food festival, everyone is encouraged to cook food from their home country to bring to work to share.

Brastel has also contributed to various charities, built a school for children in Cambodia, and donated money to the countries affected by the tsunami of 2004 and the SARS virus.

== Brastel Card ==
The Brastel Card is the Brastel product. Released in 2000, the card had gone through many iterations with the latest one having been released in November 2009 under the current name Brastel Card. Much like prior cards, it could be used to make national and international calls and could be recharged via credit card, at convenience stores, or with vouchers. In addition to the standard calling services, Brastel also offered international access to call from other countries, credit transfer, international call forwarding, international recharge of mobile phones, IP Access and SMS text messaging.

Alongside the standard calling features present in the Brastel Card, the card was then able to be linked to the FLiP VoIP service offered by Brastel. You could use the Brastel Card for affordable international calls, as well as to pay your monthly subscription and calling fees. Recently, the FLiP and BASIX phones have become more relevant to the survival of Brastel as a company, especially due to the popularity of Skype and similar services. Brastel's answer to this was FLiP, a VoIP service with a monthly fee that started from ¥500 per month.

== Other businesses related to Brastel Japan ==
- Brastel BASIX
- FLiP
- Brastel Remit
- TopSim

== Partnerships ==
- NTT
- KDDI
- EMOBILE Limited
- United Nations World Food Programme
- American Airlines
- Planet Hollywood
- All Nippon Airways
- Philippine Airlines
- Philippine National Bank
- Thai Airways
- Korean Air
- Iraqi Airways
- Srilankan Airlines
- Malaysia Airlines
- The Daily Yomiuri
- Egypt Air
- The Japan Times
- Financial Times
- Pakistan International Airlines
- Air China

== Sources ==
- Article on Nikkei BPnet (In Japanese)
- Article on Contact Center Info (In Japanese)
- Web Site Traffic
- Aboutus.org
- News2U article about Brastel
- Sunday Times Sri Lanka article about Brastel
- Web Buyers Guide article
- Start Option article about Brastel
- Cambodian article about Brastel
