= Jyoti Malhotra =

Indian journalist

Jyoti Malhotra is an Indian journalist. On 14 May 2024, she became the first female editor-in-chief of the Tribune group. Her focus has been on politics, foreign policy, diplomacy and culture.

== Career ==
Malhotra has worked in different news organisations such as India Today, Indian Express and The Print and has contributed regularly to BBC Radio.
