= Saddar, Rawalpindi =

Locality in Rawalpindi, Pakistan

Saddar
- Commercial hub of Rawalpindi
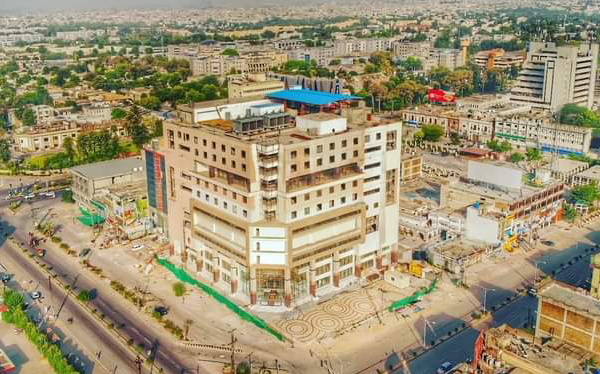
- Mall of Rawalpindi in Saddar

- Location within Pakistan
- Country: Pakistan
- Province: Punjab
- District: Rawalpindi
- Time zone: UTC+5 (PST)

Saddar (Punjabi pronunciation: [sədəɾ]) is a neighbourhood and the principal commercial hub of Rawalpindi, Punjab, Pakistan.

Located between the Mall Road and the main Railway Lines, it has some major business and commercial centres, main branches of major Pakistani banks, and colonial-era residential areas. Saddar is a home to a dense cluster of residential and commercial buildings.

== Population ==
It has a population of around 200,000 which includes a majority of Punjabis and a minority of Urdu-speaking Mohajirs, Kashmiris, and Pathans.

== Major roads ==
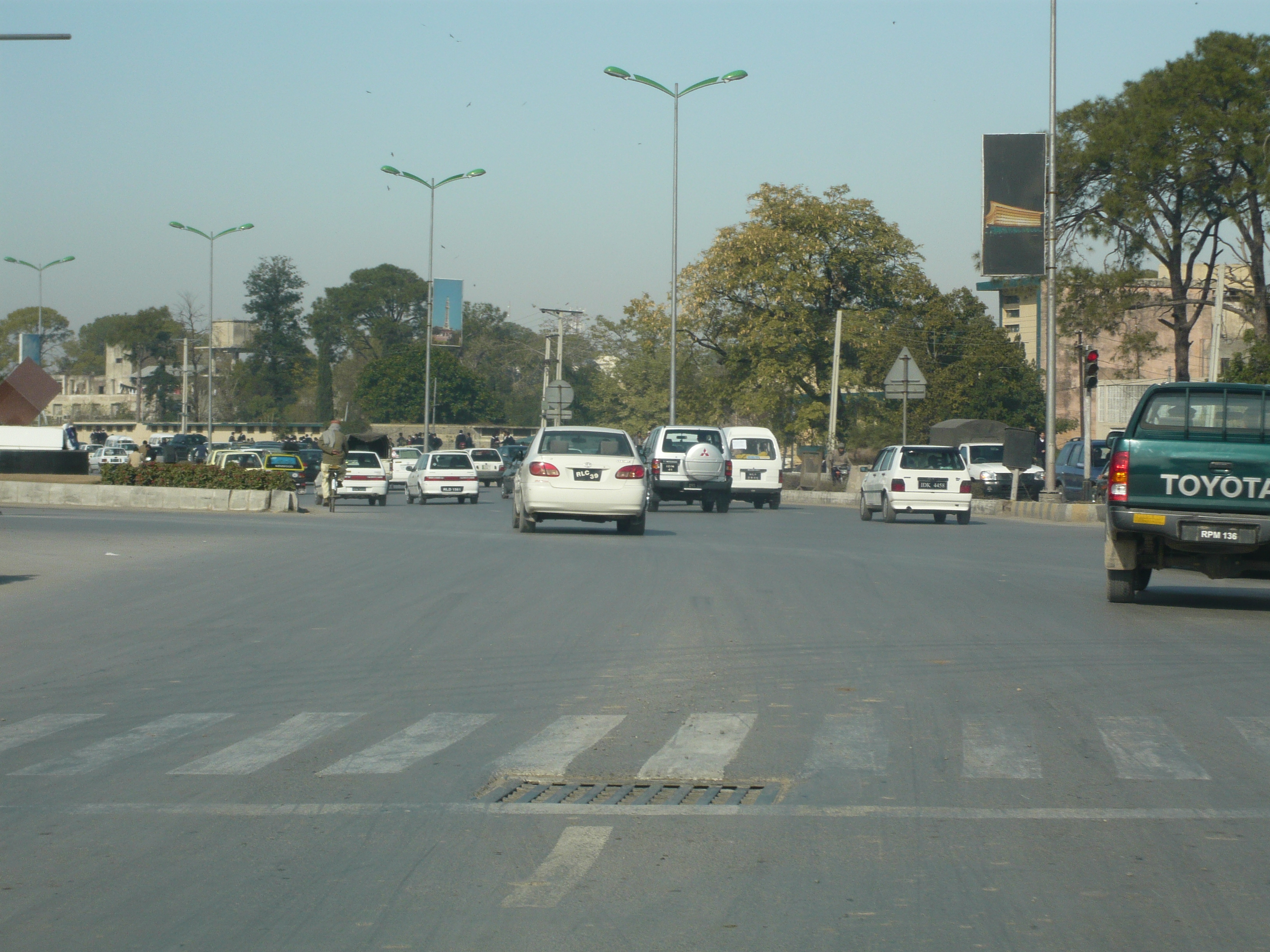
Mall Road

The Mall Road

Haider Road

It is the first parallel road to the Mall Road and is well known for banks, photocopier shops and handicraft outlets. Its old name is Lawrence Road and connects Murree Road with Mahfooz Road which leads to the city Railway station. This road is the main thoroughfare for all of the city's transportation, which connect the rest of the city as well as Islamabad.

Bank Road

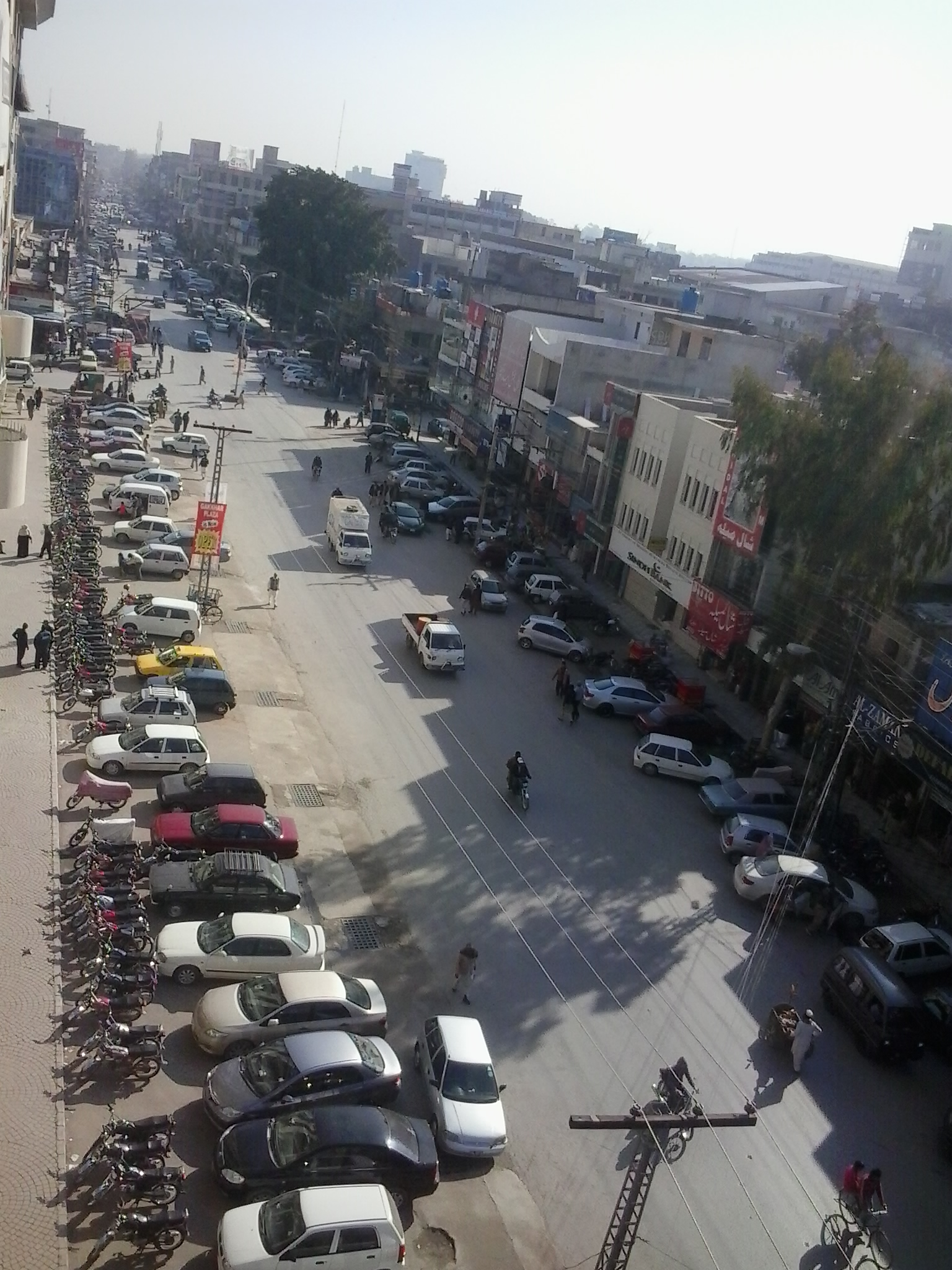
Day time view of Bank Road from Shahbaz Plaza

It also runs parallel to the Mall road just next to Haider Road and has been named so because the National Bank of Pakistan is situated on it. In fact, branches of almost all banks are situated on this road as is the prominent Gakkhar Plaza shopping center. Various markets exist for branded garments (Bonanza, Leeds, Cambridge, Levi's, Oxford, etc.) plus boutiques and shops for ceremonial dresses. Two big mobile-phone markets are on the same road.

Adamjee Road

Next to Bank Road is the Adamjee Road which road originates from the Sarwar Road at Punj Sarki (5-road) Fuel Station and crosses Kashmir Road and continues towards the northbound railway. Ministry of Defence offices and Poonch House are important landmarks on this road. Beyond Kashmir Road, there are many shops selling spare auto parts for almost every model running in Pakistan. The oldest Chhota Bazar (Small Market) is also located on this road after the spare parts shops. This road is named after a prominent Rawalpindi businessman, Sheikh Adamjee Mamojee Hakimjee. His father, Mamojee Hakimjee also has a road named after him in Rawalpindi in the Lalkurti section of the city.

Kashmir Road

This road originates from the Mall Road and hits Murree Road at Mareer Chowk. It is famous for branded garments shops, market for automobile spare parts, meat and poultry market, and tailor shops for ladies' clothes. Its previous name was Dalhousie Road. General Post Office of Pakistan Post is an important landmark on Kashmir road. The biggest mosque of Rawalpindi, Jamia Islamia (Gousia mosque) is also situated on this road.

Canning Road

This road connects Adamjee Road to the Mall Road. There are shops selling carpets and handmade products on this road.

Harding Road

This road connects Bank Road to the Mall Road and leads to the Cantonment Hospital, just behind the Gakhar Plaza.

Police Station Road

Cantt Police Station is on this road just behind the Cantonment hospital.

Mahfooz Road

This road connects Mall Road to the railway station. A big public school is also on this road.

== Schools colleges and University ==
- Fatima Jinnah Women University The Mall Road
- Govt. Denny's High School (since 1871)
- F G College for Women (old C. B. College)
- F G Girls High School
- F G Public Secondary School (old Cantt Public High School)
- Saint John's High School
- F G Boyes Scc School Adam Jee Road Rawalpindi
- F G Sir Syed School for Boys Sir Syed Road
- Pakistan Advanced College of Excellence
- F G Boys High School, Daryabad, Rawalpindi
- F G Sir Syed School for Girls Sir Syed Road
- F G Sir Syed College The Mall Road

== Hospitals and clinics ==
- Cantonment General Hospital
- Health ways
- Dr. Shah Medical Dental Health care center
- Hearts International Hospital
- Jinnah Memorial Hospital
- Mazhar Eye Hospital
- Safia Memorial Clinics
- Al-Ihsan Hospital

== Religious centres ==
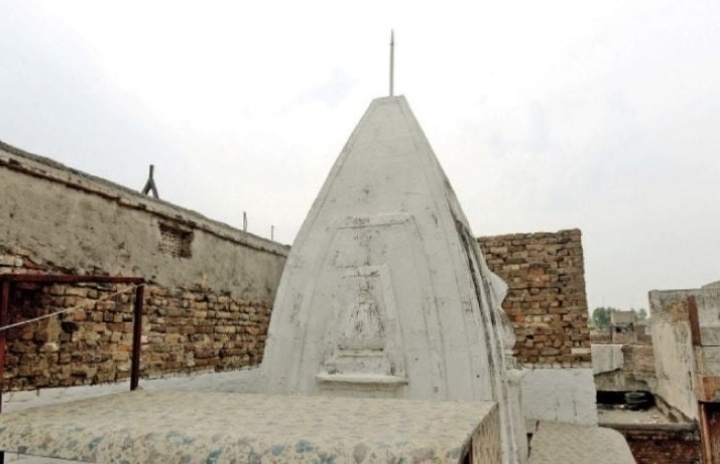
Shikara of Shri Krishna Mandir, Saddar, Rawalpindi

- Ghousia Mosques, part of Varan Tours office/Old GTS, on Adam Ji Road
- Shri Krishna Mandir, Rawalpindi
