= Shekhar Gupta =

Indian journalist (born 1957)

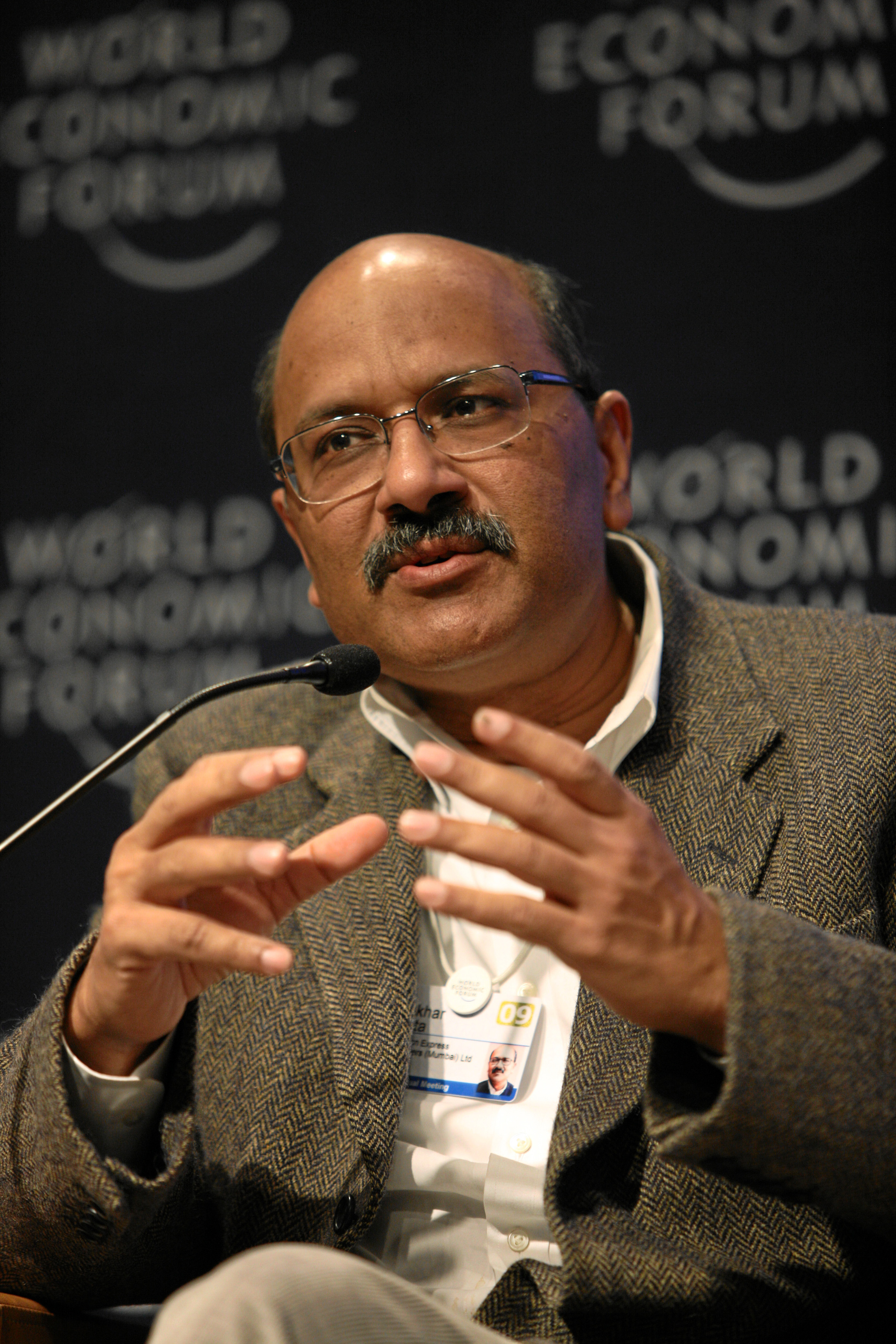
- Gupta at the 2009 World Economic Forum
- Born: 26 August 1957 (age 69); Palwal, India
- Education: Panjab University
- Occupation: Journalist
- Known for: Hosting Walk the Talk; National Interest; Cut the Clutter; Off the Cuff ThePrint
- Title: Founder & Editor-in-Chief of ThePrint
- Spouse: Neelam Jolly
- Awards: Padma Bhushan (2009)

Shekhar Gupta (born 26 August 1957) is an Indian journalist and author. He is the founder and the current editor-in-chief of ThePrint. He is also a columnist for the Business Standard and pens a weekly column which appears every Saturday.

He has had long stints at The Indian Express and India Today. Gupta writes a weekly column called "National Interest" for India Today magazine. His "National Interest" columns for The Indian Express were collected in his 2014 book Anticipating India. He also hosted an interview-based television show Walk the Talk on NDTV 24x7. He was awarded the Padma Bhushan in 2009 by the Government of India for his contribution to journalism and was elected President of the Editor's Guild of India in 2018.

== Early life and career ==
Shekhar Gupta initially studied for three years (1962–1965) in Saraswati Shishu Mandir in Palwal, then in Punjab. He completed his Bachelor of Journalism degree at Panjab University (1975–1976).

He started his career as a journalist working for The Indian Express in 1977. He worked there for 6 years and then resigned to join India Today where he covered Operation Bluestar, the Nellie Massacre in Assam and the Gulf War in 1991. He then rejoined The Indian Express as editor-in-chief and CEO, where he worked for 19 years from 1996 to 2015. He also hosted the show, "Walk The Talk with Shekhar Gupta" for NDTV for 15 years in which he talked to over 600 guests. He resigned from Indian Express in 2014 and joined India Today for a brief period of 2 months.

Currently he is the editor-in-chief and founder of ThePrint, which was launched in August 2017. Gupta has stated that the mission for ThePrint is to be "factual and liberal".

== Awards and honours ==
Shekhar Gupta has received assorted awards: the 1985 Inlaks award for young journalist of the year, G. K. Reddy Award for Journalism, and the Fakhruddin Ali Ahmed Memorial Award for National Integration. He was awarded Padma Bhushan by the then Indian Government in 2009 for his contribution to journalism. Gupta was furthermore awarded an Honorary Doctor of Science degree from Thapar University (Patiala, India) in 2013.

Under his leadership, The Indian Express won the Vienna-based International Press Institute's Award for Outstanding Journalism in the Public Interest thrice: The first time for its coverage of the Gujarat riots of 2002, the second time for uncovering the Bihar flood relief scam in 2009 and the third time for its sustained investigation into the Malegaon and Modasa blasts of 2008 and the alleged role of extremists and organisations.

== Controversies ==
In April 2019, Shekhar Gupta was one of the three journalists mentioned in the supplementary charge-sheet of AgustaWestland chopper deal scam. Enforcement Directorate alleged that the main accused Christian Michel accepted that he through a middlemen paid Shekhar Gupta to "tone down" an article related to the deal in The Indian Express. The chargesheet of ED was leaked to the media in April 2019 just few days before the national elections. Delhi High court sent a notice to ED about the leaks. It was Shekhar Gupta and Manu Pubby from Indian Express who brought this AgustaWestland scam into the public domain and the deal was cancelled by then UPA government after Indian Express exposed the scam.

== Bibliography ==
=== Books ===
- Gupta, Shekhar (1984). Assam : a valley divided. New Delhi: Vikas.
- — (1995). India redefines its role. IISS Adelphi Paper Series 293. Oxford: Oxford University Press for the International Institute for Strategic Studies.
- — (2014). Anticipating India : the best of National Interest. New Delhi: Express Group.
- — (2018). Walk the talk : decoding politicians. New Delhi: Rupa Publications.

=== Essays and reporting ===
- Gupta, Shekhar (6 October 2014). "Making sense of Xi slap". National Interest. India Today. 39 (40): 20–21.
- Gupta, Shekhar (2 October 2015). "Main-streaming The Lynch-Fringe". National Interest. Business Standard.
