= Royal Artillery Bazaar =

- Residential and commercial locality
- Country: Pakistan
- Province: Punjab (Pakistan)
- District: Rawalpindi
- Time zone: UTC+5 (PST)

The Royal Artillery Bazaar is a residential and commercial locality to the west of general headquarters of Pakistan Army in Rawalpindi, Punjab, Pakistan. Reminiscent of the British colonial times and named after the Royal Artillery, the area is more commonly known by the abbreviated name of 'R A Bazaar.'

== Population ==
R A Bazaar has a population of around 50,000, which includes a majority of Punjabis, Urdu speaking Muhajirs, Kashmiris and Pashtuns.

== Important landmarks ==
It is situated between the General Headquarters (GHQ) of Pakistan Army and the Military Hospital (MH). It has a commercial area (Bazaar), residential area and some important static military units which include:

- Headquarters of Frontier Works Organization (FWO).
- Headquarters National Logistic Cell (NLC).
- Head office of Canteen Stores Department (CSD).

Housing colony of the Pakistan Telecommunication Limited (PTCL) and Askari apartments are important residential areas of R A Bazaar.

Rawalpindi office of the Postmaster General is also situated in R A Bazaar.

== Important roads ==
- Main R A Bazar road, which is a south-wards continuation of Kashmir road, connects Mall road on the north with Baees-number-Chungi on the south.
- Sher Khan road.
- It is linked with Bedian Road.

== Educational institutes ==
- Station School
- F.G Boys High School

== RA Bazaar in news headlines ==
- Suicide blast in R A Bazaar on 4 Feb 2008. 12 killed, over 30 injured in RA Bazaar suicide blast - Pakistan Times
- Suicide blast in R A Bazaar on 20 January 2014 kills 14 people
