= Kabari Bazaar =

Kabari Bazaar کباڑی بازار
- Bazaar
- Country: Pakistan
- Province: Punjab
- City: Rawalpindi

Kabari Bazar (Urdu: کباڑی بازار) is a flea market located in Rawalpindi, Pakistan.

Kabari Bazar is known as a marketplace of second-hand goods in Rawalpindi. Apart from other goods, military equipment, including military uniform and military boots are also sold there. Some shops also sell smuggled NATO supplies.

== See also ==
- American Market
