= Valmiki Swamiji Mandir, Rawalpindi =

Maharishi Valmik Swamiji Mandir

Religion
- Affiliation: Hinduism
- District: Rawalpindi
- Deity: Valmiki
- Status: Active

Location
- Location: Gracy Lines, Chaklala Cantonment, Rawalpindi
- State: Punjab
- Country: Pakistan

Architecture
- Completed: 1935

Valmiki Swamiji Mandir (commonly called Valmiki Mandir or Balaknath Temple) is a Hindu temple located in the Gracy Lines neighbourhood of Chaklala Cantonment, Rawalpindi, in the Punjab state of Pakistan. The temple was built before the partition of British India and has served the local Hindu community as one of the principal places of worship in the area. It is one of the 3 main Hindu temple in the Rawalpindi district, others being Lal Kurti Temple and the Shri Krishna mandir. Festivals like Diwali and Holi are celebrated here.

== History ==
The temple is reported to have been constructed in 1935 and has functioned since the pre-partition era as an active temple for Rawalpindi's Hindu residents.

== 2014 demolition threat and legal action ==
In August 2014, reports stated that Station Headquarters had issued notices to residents of Block 141, Gracy Lines, Chaklala, to vacate the area as part of local development (including construction of an educational and housing complex or military barracks). The move raised fears that the temple and nearby Hindu residences could be demolished.

Members of the local Hindu community petitioned the civil court seeking relief. Early reports noted a temporary stay order obtained against immediate demolition, though the stay provided only short-term respite and residents were reported to have been offered alternative accommodation. Authorities reportedly told the community they would build a replacement temple if relocation were required. The temple was not demolitioned and is currently active.

== See also ==
- Hinduism in Pakistan
- Hinduism in Islamabad Capital Territory
- Kalyan Das Temple
