= Telephone card =

Card used to pay for telephone services

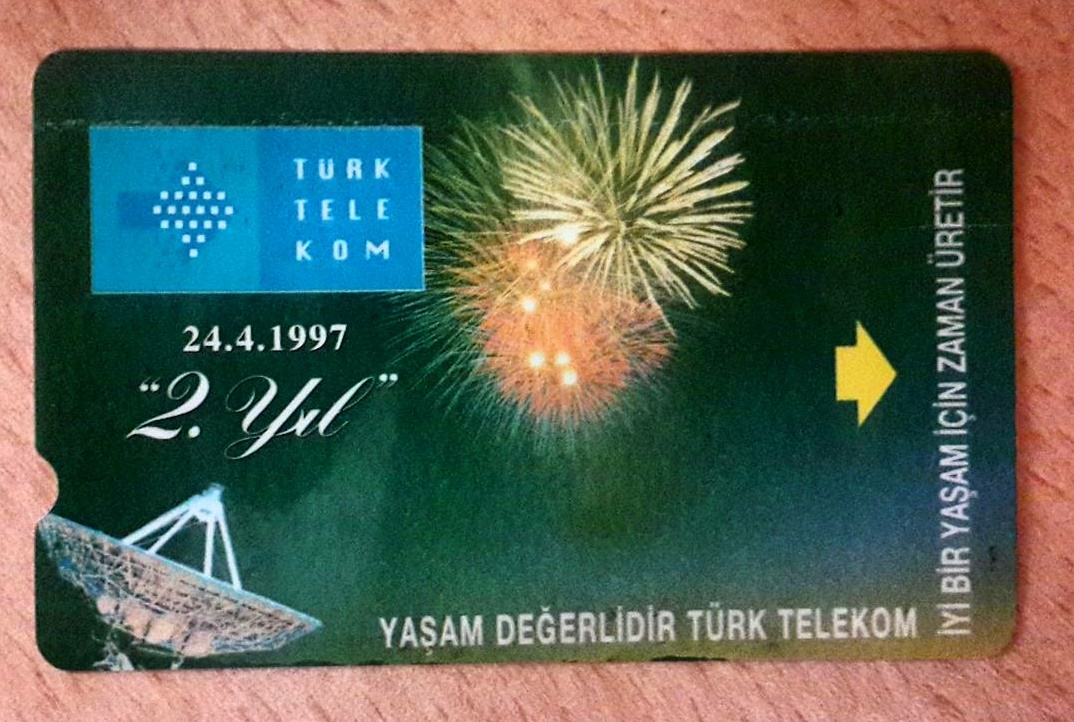
Turk Telekom Phone Card

A telephone card (also telecard, teleca, calling card or phone card for short) is a credit card-size plastic or paper card used to pay for telephone services (often international or long-distance calling). It is not necessary to have the physical card except with a stored-value system; knowledge of the access telephone number to dial and the PIN is sufficient. Standard cards which can be purchased and used without any sort of account facility give a fixed amount of credit and are discarded when used up; rechargeable cards can be topped up, or collect payment in arrears. The system for payment and the way in which the card is used to place a telephone call vary from card to card.

Calling cards usually come equipped with PIN for user protection and security. Most companies require user to enter the PIN before granting access to the calling card's funds. PINs often are printed on a piece of paper found inside the calling card's packaging. Once the users makes their first call, some companies offer the option of eliminating the PIN altogether to speed up the calling process. Companies that sell virtual calling cards online typically send the PIN via email.

== Stored-value phone cards ==
A stored-value phone card stores the available credit balance in an analog or digital memory physically embedded in the card. This balance can be read by a public payphone when the card is inserted into the card reader. This is superficially similar to a bank automated teller machine, but a stored-value card is more closely analogous to a change purse. While ATMs (as well as the remote memory systems discussed below) use the card merely to identify the associated account and record changes in a central database, stored-value systems make a physical alteration to the card, or write data to an embedded chip or magnetic stripe to reflect the new balance after a call. Some magnetic cards also show the remaining value.

Used primarily for payphones, stored-value systems avoid the time lag and expense of communication with a central database, which would have been technically complex before the 1990s.

There are several ways in which the value can be encoded on the card:

The earliest system used a magnetic stripe as information carrier, similar to the technology of ATMs and key cards, and the first magnetic strip phonecard, manufactured by SIDA, was issued in 1976 in Italy.

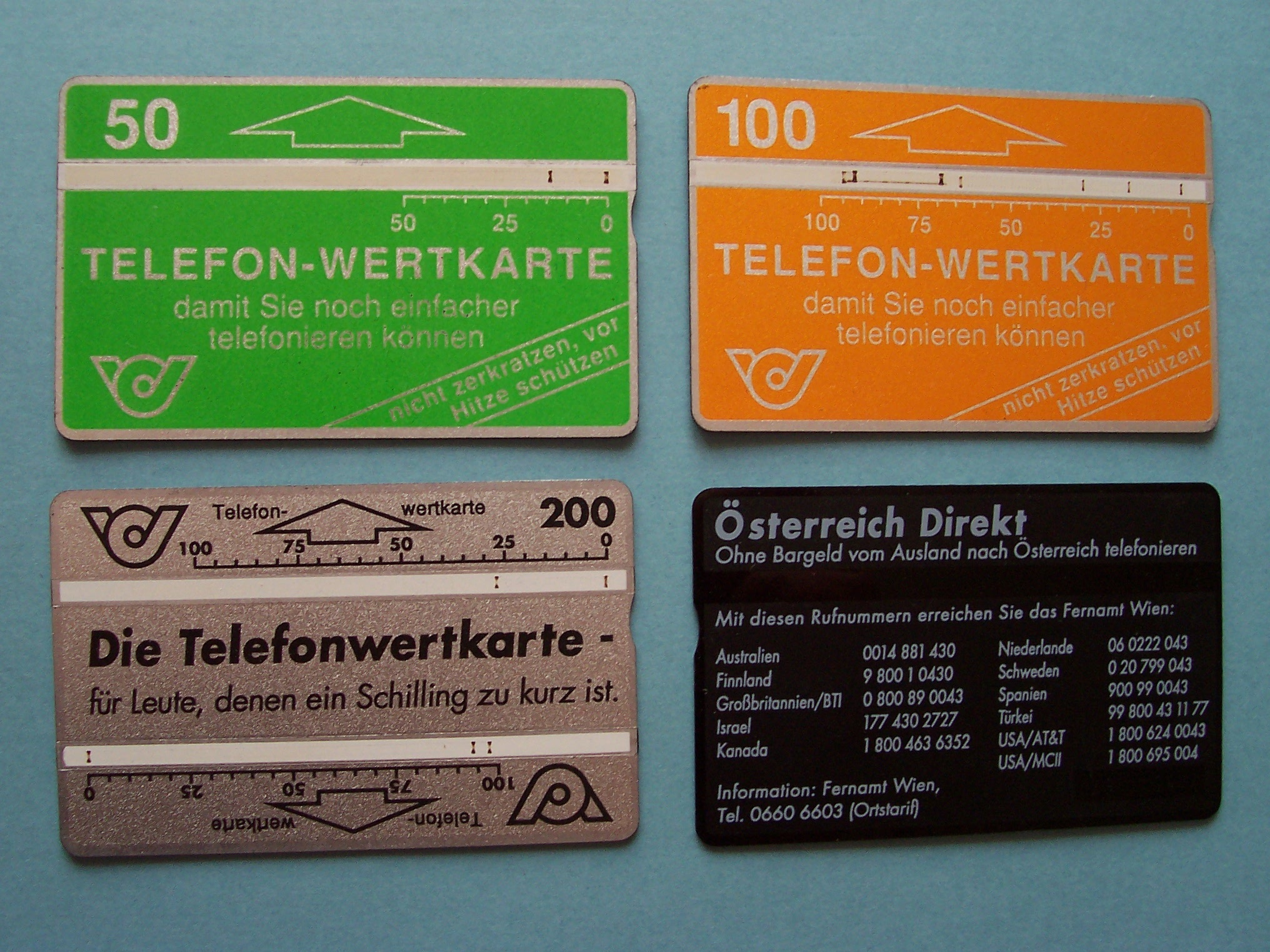
Optical phonecards from Austria. The balance is shown by the vertical marks on the white bar.

The next technology used optical storage. Optical phonecards get their name from optical structure embossed inside the cards. This optical structure is heated and destroyed after use of the units. Visible marks are left on the top of the cards, so that the user can see the balance of remaining units. Optical cards were produced by Landis+Gyr and Sodeco from Switzerland and were popular early phonecards in many countries with first optical phonecards successfully introduced in 1977 in Belgium. Such technology was very secure and not easily hackable but chip cards phased out the optical phone cards around the world and the last Landis+Gyr factory closed in May 2006 when optical phonecards were still in use in few countries like Austria, Israel and Egypt.

The third system of stored-value phone cards are smart cards and use an embedded microchip. These were first launched on a large scale in 1986 in Germany by Deutsche Bundespost after three years of testing, and in France by France Télécom. Many other countries followed suit, including Ireland in 1990 and the UK circa 1994–1995, which phased out the old green Landis+Gyr cards in favor of the chip (smart) cards. The initial microchips were easy to hack, typically by scratching off the programming-voltage contact on the card, which rendered the phone unable to reduce the card's value after a call. But by the mid-to-late 1990s, highly secure technology aided the spread of chip phonecards worldwide.

By the 2010s, the rise in the use of mobile phones led to the withdrawal of phone cards by some operators, with BT in the UK withdrawing phone cards from sale in 2012.

== Remote memory systems ==
Making a remote memory prepaid or calling card call requires the user to make two calls. It is necessary to dial an access telephone number to connect to the calling card system. There are several methods. One is via a toll-free number, with larger companies offering this internationally. Access through a local number has become increasingly popular in recent years. Toll-free calls are paid for by the recipient (the calling card company), which passes on the cost through higher call charges; total cost of a call to the user is often lower using a local number. When travelling through several local areas a toll-free service may be preferable.

Once connected to the access number, the account is identified by keying in a PIN (the most popular method) or by swiping a card with embedded chip or magnetic stripe. After validation the balance remaining on the card may be announced, and the desired number may be keyed in. The available minutes may be announced, and the call is connected. Many cards make a verbal announcement if credit is running out.

Prepaid or calling cards are usually much cheaper than other telephone services, particularly for travelers who do not have easy access to other services. Hotel telephones can be very expensive, particularly for long-distance calls. Cellular services are flexible, but may attract high roaming charges away from the home area.

=== Telephone accounts symbolized by a card ===
The second main technology of phonecards is remote memory, which uses a toll or toll-free access number to reach the database and check for balance on product.

The first public prepaid remote memory phonecard was issued in the United States in December 1980 by Phone Line. As telecom industries around the world became deregulated, remote memory cards were issued in various countries. Remote memory phonecards can be used from any tone-mode phone and do not require special card readers. Since remote memory cards are more accessible and have lower costs, remote memory phone cards have proliferated. However, the utility of these cards is reduced by the large number of digits that need to be entered during usage. To call a long-distance number, the user first dials the local access number, then keys in the secret code, followed by the actual long-distance number. Based on the long-distance number entered, the time remaining on the card is announced, and the call is finally processed through.

Remote memory phonecards are in essence text; requiring an access number, a unique PIN and instructions. Therefore, the instructions can be printed on virtually anything, or can be delivered via e-mail or the Internet. Currently many websites post phone card details through e-mail.

Phone cards are available in most countries in retail stores, retail chains and commonly post offices or corner stores. In general, remote memory phonecards can be issued by any company and come in countless varieties. They can focus on calling to certain countries or regions and have specific features such as rechargeability, pinless dial, speed dial and more. Phone cards may have connection fees, taxes and maintenance fees, all influencing the rates.

=== Accounts without a card (Virtual phonecards) ===
Since the early 2000s calling card service providers have introduced calling accounts not associated with a physical card. Calling accounts can be purchased over the Internet using credit cards and are instantly delivered to the customer via e-mail. This e-mail contains the PIN and instructions for using the service. The service may be prepaid, or may take payment from a credit card or by direct debit. Some prepaid card companies allow accounts to be recharged online manually or automatically via a method called auto-top-up.

Some virtual cards offer PINless Dialing, either by dialling a number unique to the customer, or by recognising the telephone number which originated the call by Caller ID and relating it to the appropriate account. Some virtual phone cards allow customers to view their call detail reports (CDRs) online by logging into their account.

The virtual phonecard has become a multi-billion US dollar industry as of 2009, with a number of large corporations and smaller dot com companies. While long-distance inland calls have been offered by calling cards, by the mid-2000s conventional carriers reduced their rates to be competitive; however in many countries calling-card type indirect services can be much cheaper than normal calls.

== Phonecard as an artifact or collectible ==
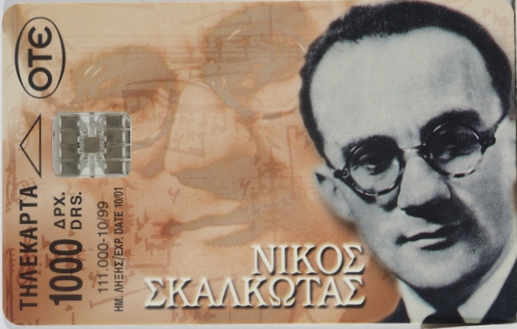
Phone card featuring Nikos Skalkottas' likeness

Telecom companies have placed advertising on phonecards, or featured celebrity portraits, artwork, or attractive photography. In the 1990’s, Sports cards manufactured by The Score Board, Inc. in cooperation with Sprint Corporation featured a combination of athletes with phone cards. As the supply of any one design is limited, this has led some people to collect disposable phonecards. Due to the large number of phonecards, collectors prefer to specialize and collect cards in a certain way. Some collect phonecards that have only one specific chip type or were issued in the same country, while others prefer to get one of everything. Online clubs and catalogs provide collectors with detailed information on phonecards. In addition, these clubs include forums to assist with discussions between collectors.

== Support in telephones ==
Most modern telephones, both mobile and fixed, have memory locations in which telephone numbers can be stored. Some telephones have facilities to make calls through a calling card service whose access details and PIN are also stored in the telephone's memory. This may be implemented in different ways, often by pressing one button before making a call; some telephones support "chain dialing", allowing additional numbers to be dialed when on a call (e.g., dial a PIN and a second number after connecting to an access number). So long as long enough sequences can be stored it is possible to store an access number, pause, PIN, and ultimate telephone number in a single normal phone memory location. Software applications which add calling card support are available for a small charge or free for some smartphones.

== See also ==
- Telephone token
- Scratchcard
- Prepaid mobile phone
- SIM card
