= Lalkurti =

- locality
- Lalkurti, Rawalpindi Cantonement.
- Country: Pakistan
- Province: Punjab
- District: Rawalpindi

Government
- Time zone: UTC+5 (PST)

Lalkurti (literally red shirt; referring to British Infantry "Red coats" from colonial era), is a locality in the heart of Rawalpindi cantonment in Punjab province of Pakistan. Places with the same name are also found in many other garrison cities of Pakistan and India, such as Peshawar, Lahore, Kanpur, Ambala, Meerut and Delhi.

Located to the south of Mall Road, Lalkurti Rawalpindi is a bazaar and a residential area from the British colonial era. The Lalkurti Bazaar area, formerly known as B I Bazaar (British Infantry Bazaar), is one of the busiest shopping areas of Rawalpindi cantonment.

The importance of Lalkurti in the history of Rawalpindi and Pakistan lies in its once being the hub of Pakistan's military and political activities, especially in the 1960s, when Rawalpindi served as the interim capital of Pakistan. The first session of the third National Assembly of Pakistan was held on 8 June 1962 at Ayub Hall, Lalkurti.

== Population and demography ==
Lalkurti has a population of around 200,000, which includes a majority of Punjabis and a minority of Urdu speaking Mohajirs, Kashmiris and Pathans. A significant proportion of population has roots in Eastern Punjab. Besides Muslim majority, a significant minority of Christians and a very small number of Hindus also reside at Lalkurti.

== Zulf-e-Bengal Building ==
The Zulf-e-Bengal Building, also known as Agha House, is a prominent heritage structure located on Mamoo Jee Road in the historic Lalkurti area of Rawalpindi, Pakistan. The building holds significant historical and cultural value, serving as a symbol of the region's diverse past.

Before the independence of Pakistan in 1947, the building was owned by Ishar Dass, a wealthy Hindu trader and entrepreneur. He was the manufacturer of the popular hair oil brand Zulf-e-Bengal—meaning "the long hair of a Bengali woman"—which gained fame across South Asia for its effectiveness and appeal.

After Partition, the property came into the possession of the Agha family, and has since been known locally as Agha House. Today, it stands as one of Lalkurti's most well-known landmarks, representing a unique blend of colonial architecture, commercial legacy, and post-Partition history. The story of Lalkurti is considered incomplete without mention of this iconic building.

== NUST building ==
The building hosting the National University of Sciences and Technology, Pakistan (NUST), situated at the junction of Tameez-ud-din road (formerly called the Church road) and Mamoo Jee Road (now called Lalkurti Road), has a special historical significance. The road was named after prominent Rawalpindi businessman Mamoo Jee Hakimjee and it was here in NUST's Ayub Hall that the national legislative assembly sessions were held for some time in the 1960s. The capital had been shifted from Karachi to Islamabad, but the building for the National Assembly of Pakistan had not been constructed by then and Rawalpindi served as the interim capital of the country. Ayub Hall has been named after Field Marshal Muhammad Ayub Khan, former president of Pakistan.

== Schools and colleges ==
- Army Public School and College
- Army Public College of Management Sciences (APCOMS)
- Military College of Signals
- SLS Montessori
- Presentation Convent
- F G Technical High School
- Saint Catherine high school
- KIPS academy

== Mosques, churches and temples ==
There are six mosques and two churches (St. Joseph's Cathedral and Christ Church) in the locality. Despite their religious differences, the Christian minority and the Muslims have not had any notable conflict here.

There are a few temples in Lalkurti which are a reminder of the Hindu population that lived here before partition. These temples are now in disuse and have been annexed into the neighbouring houses. The only temple being used for worship by a small presently existing Hindu population is the Lal Kurti Temple.

== Museum ==
- Army Museum is situated next to the CSD shopping complex, on Iftikhar Janjua road (formerly called Napier road). It exhibits vintage arms and ammunition, relics of past wars, war paintings and belongings of the Pakistani war heroes.

== Transportation ==
- Nur Khan Base is at a distance of ten kilometers.
- Daewoo Express Bus service terminal is at a distance of ten kilometers.
- Rawalpindi Railway station is only 4 km away.
