= ThePrint =

Indian news website

The Print
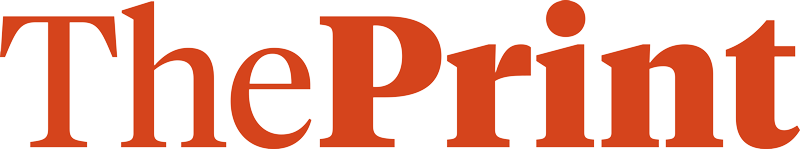

- Website type: News media
- Available in: English, Hindi
- Country of origin: India
- Owner: Printline Media Pvt. Ltd.
- Founder: Shekhar Gupta
- Revenue: Ads, subscription
- Website: theprint.in
- Commercial: Yes
- Launched: August 2017; 9 years ago

ThePrint is an Indian online newspaper owned by Printline Media Pvt Ltd. It was launched by journalist Shekhar Gupta in August 2017.

== History ==
Printline Media Pvt. Ltd, founded by journalist Shekhar Gupta, was incorporated in New Delhi, India on 16 September 2016.

ThePrint is noted for focusing on politics and policy. The venture is associated with the Off the Cuff programme that is broadcast on Aaj Tak and promoted on ThePrint's YouTube and Facebook channels.

In May 2017, it received an undisclosed amount of funding from N.R. Narayana Murthy, Nandan Nilekani, Ratan Tata, Kiran Mazumdar Shaw, Uday Kotak, Vijay Shekhar Sharma, Rajiv C. Mody, Ravi Thakran, Bhavish Aggarwal, Nirmal Jain, R. Venkatraman, Karan Bhagat and Yatin Shah.

Gupta, as his position in editor-in-chief, in a letter to readers stated the mission of the ThePrint was to be "factual and liberal". ThePrint has claimed to commit to its code of ethics for journalists which it has published on its website.

On 19 June 2026, ThePrint published an article that included a fabricated quote from Amazon founder Jeff Bezos that originated from a parody social media account. Snopes debunked the fake quote in a fact-check article published on 22 June 2026, referencing that ThePrint cited it as if it were genuine.

== Products ==
=== Website ===
ThePrint, being a new media digital platform primarily publishes its news stories on its website with majority of coverage in the English language. The platform additionally has a Hindi language edition of the website as well. The news coverage is divided into factual news reporting and opinion pieces.

==== Subscription ====
The website is primarily supported by digital ad revenue, however it allows one time donations and recurring subscription from patrons.

==== Off The Cuff ====
Off The Cuff is a series of candid talk shows organized in collaboration with Aaj Tak and launched in February 2016, though recent editions have been online only editions hosted by ThePrint alone. It hosts prominent personalities from across the spectrum in engaging conversations, some of its prominent guests being Amish Tripathi, Gita Gopinath, Martin Wolf and Francis Fukuyama.
