= Lal Kurti Temple =

Hindu temple in Rawalpindi, Pakistan

- بالمیکی مندر

Religion
- Affiliation: Hinduism
- District: Rawalpindi District
- Deity: Valmiki

Location
- Location: Lalkurti, Rawalpindi
- State: Punjab
- Country: Pakistan

Architecture
- Type: Mughal-influenced
- Completed: 1905

Lal Kurti Temple (also known as the Balmiki Temple or Valmiki Mandir) is a Hindu temple located in the historic Lalkurti area of Rawalpindi, Punjab, Pakistan. Built in 1905, it is used for worship by the city's small Hindu community and as of 2025 was the only Hindu shrine still in use (as of 2025) in Lalkurti, a neighbourhood that historically had multiple places of worship for different faiths. It is one of the three main Hindu temples in the Rawalpindi district, along with the Krishna Temple and the Valmiki Swamiji Mandir.

== History ==
Lalkurti developed in the mid-to-late 19th century as a bazaar serving the British Indian Army; the area's name derives from the red tunics of soldiers who shopped there. The temple structure was completed in 1905 and remained a focal point for local Hindus before and after the Partition of India. Following 1947, most Hindus left the area, but a small community continued to worship at the temple.

In the years after Partition, Kheera Lal served as the temple's first post-Partition administrator. His grave remains within a side portion of the complex.

== Worship and community ==
The temple hosts daily worship and major Hindu festivals including Diwali, Holi and Raksha Bandhan. Temple administration has been led by members of a local family associated with the Pakistan Hindu Balmik Welfare Society.

== See also ==
- Shri Krishna Temple, Rawalpindi
- Hinduism in Pakistan
