= Poonch House =

- Interactive map of the Poonch House area

General information
- Status: Operational
- Type: Government building
- Architectural style: Indo-Saracenic architecture
- Location: Multan Road, near Chauburji, Lahore, Punjab, Pakistan
- Coordinates: 31°33′3″N 74°18′5″E
- Named for: Poonch Division
- Completed: 1849
- Owner: Government of Pakistan

Technical details
- Floor area: 211 kanals

Poonch House (Urdu: پونچھ ہاؤس) is a historic state building located on Multan Road near Chauburji in Lahore, Pakistan. It is one of the oldest British colonial buildings in Lahore.

== History ==
It was constructed in 1849 during the reign of Sikh Maharaja Duleep Singh and is associated with Sir Henry Lawrence, who resided there while serving in Lahore and acting as the Maharaja's guardian.

Named after the Poonch Division of the former princely state of Jammu and Kashmir, the estate originally extended over 211 kanals before its conversion into government offices and a residential colony. It also served as the residence of Sir Meredith Plowden, then chief justice of the Lahore High Court. The 1931 trial of Indian independence activist Bhagat Singh took place in this building.

Following the creation of Pakistan, the property was transferred to the Federal Government in 1962 and housed the Industrial and Commercial Museum from 1950 to 1985.

In 2024, the Bhagat Singh Gallery was opened in the building.
