= Rawalpindi District =

District in Punjab, Pakistan

Rawalpindi District ضِلع راولپِنڈى
- District of Punjab
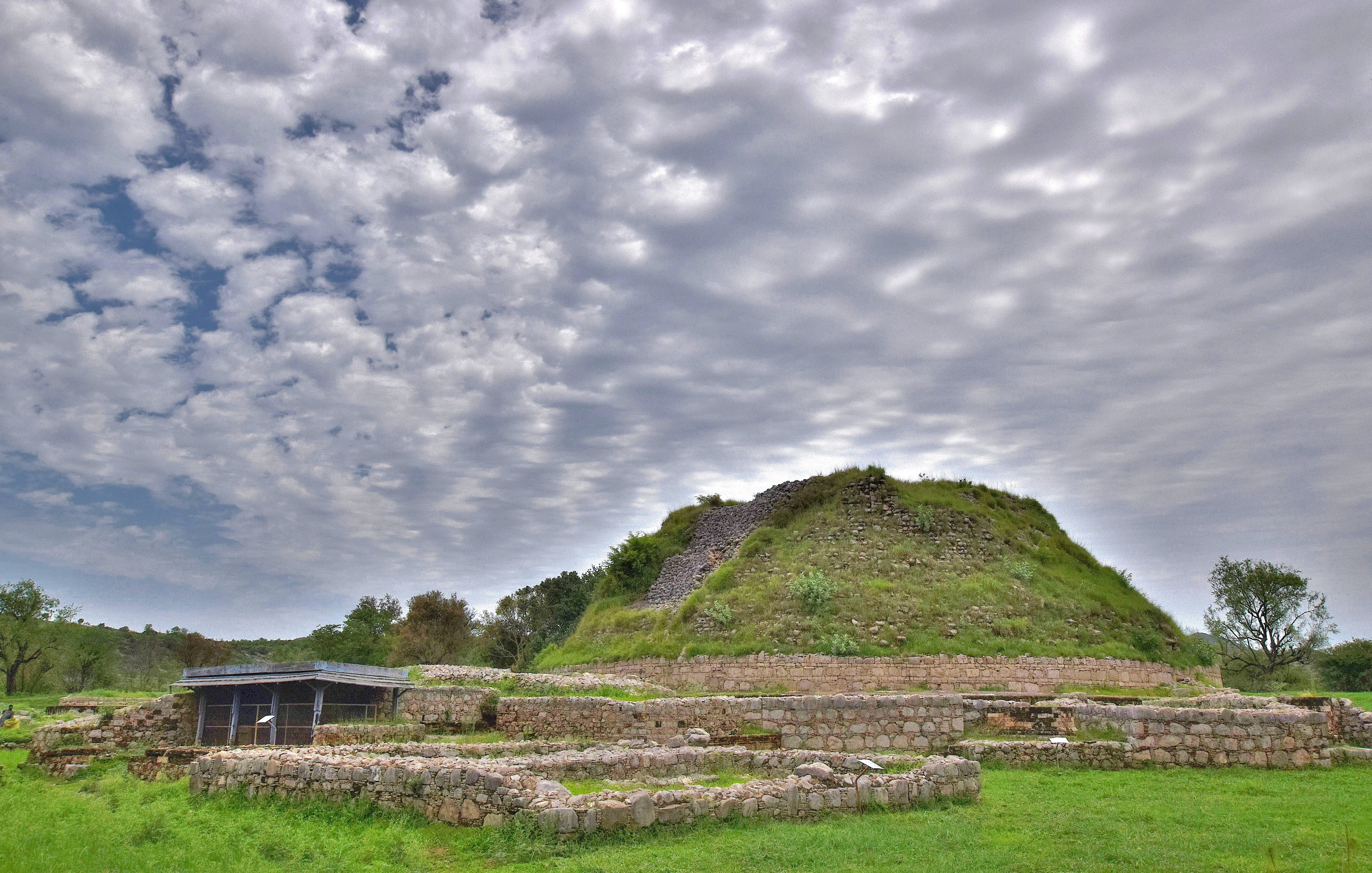
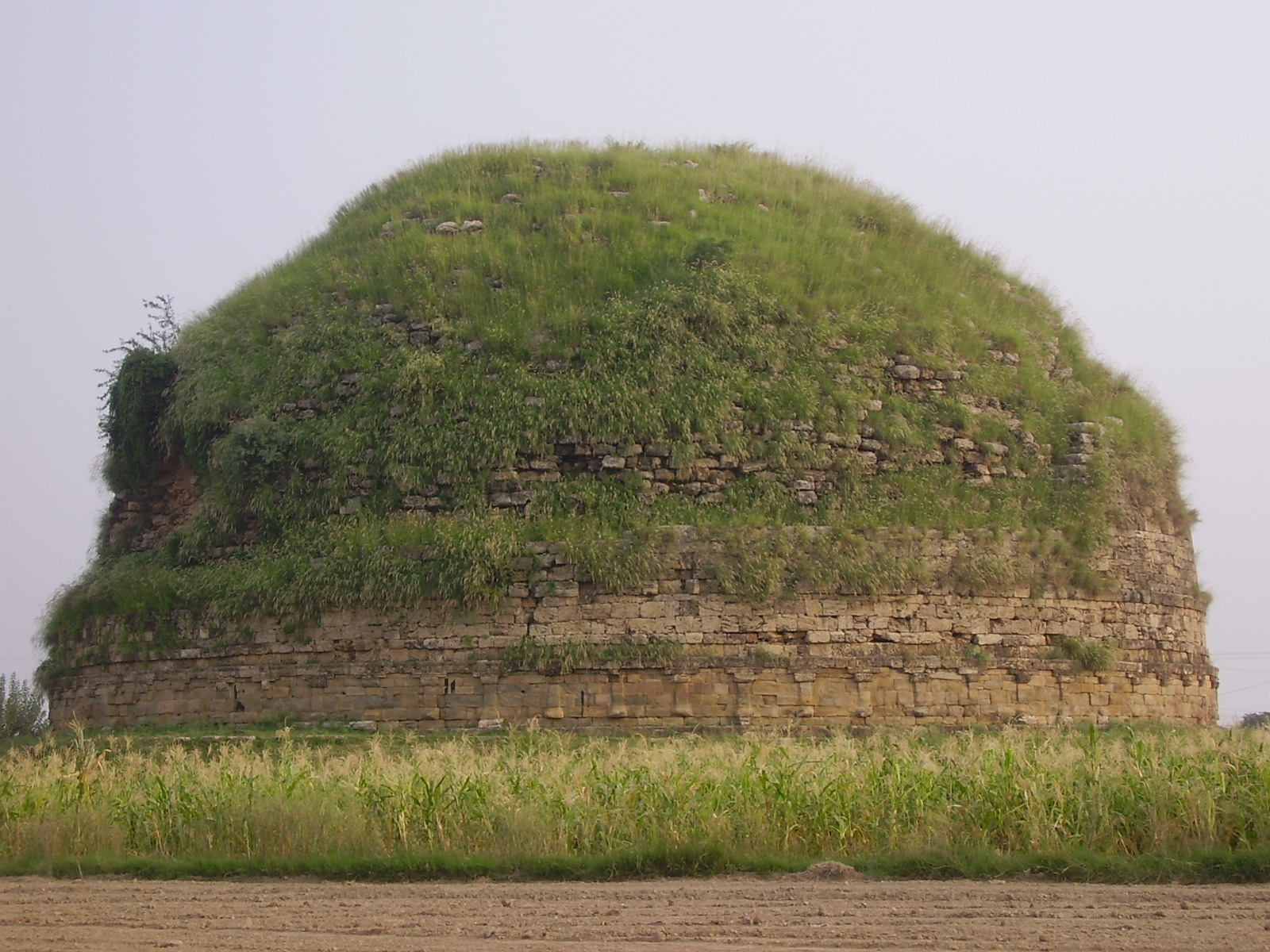
- Top: Dharmarajika Stupa, Taxila, Bottom: Mankiala Stupa

- Map of Punjab with Rawalpindi District highlighted Rawalpindi is located in the north of Punjab.
- Coordinates: 33°20′N 73°15′E
- Country: Pakistan
- Province: Punjab
- Division: Rawalpindi
- Headquarter: Rawalpindi
- Number of Tehsils: 5

Government
  - Type: Divisional Administration
  - Commissioner Rawalpindi: Engineer Aamir Khan Khattak (BPS-20 PAS)
  - District Police Officer (DPO): Khalid Mehmood Hamdani (BPS-19 PSP)
  - District Health Officer: N/A

Area
  - District of Punjab: 4,547 km^{2} (1,756 sq mi)
- Highest elevation: 1,800 m (5,900 ft)
- Lowest elevation: 340 m (1,100 ft)

Population (2023)
  - District of Punjab: 5,745,964 (excluding murree district)
  - Density: 1,264/km^{2} (3,273/sq mi)
  - Urban: 4,031,341 (70.15%)
  - Rural: 1,714,623 (29.85%)

Literacy
  - Literacy rate: Total: (83.22%); Male: (87.90%); Female: (78.36%)
- Time zone: UTC+5 (PKT)
- Area code: 051
- National Assembly Seats (2024): Total 7: PML(N) (6); PPP (1); PTI (0)
- Provincial Assembly Seats (2024): Total 13: PML(N) (9); PTI (3); MWM (1); PPP (0)
- Website: rawalpindi.punjab.gov.pk

Rawalpindi District (Punjabi and Urdu: ضِلع راولپِنڈى, romanized: Zilā' Rāvalpinḍī) is a district within the Rawalpindi Division Punjab, Pakistan. Located within the Pothohar Plateau in northwestern Punjab, it is the third most-populous district in the province. Rawalpindi serves as the headquarters of the district, with the northern part of the district forming part of the Islamabad-Rawalpindi metropolitan area.

The district has an area of 5,286 km^{2} (2,041 sq mi). Originally, its area was 6,192 km^{2} (2,391 sq mi) until the 1960s when Islamabad Capital Territory was carved out of the district, giving away an area of 906 km^{2} (350 sq mi). It is situated on the southern slopes of the north-western extremities of the Himalayas, including large mountain tracts with rich valleys traversed by mountain rivers. The chief rivers are the Indus and the Jhelum, and it is noted for its milder climate and abundant rainfall due to its proximity to the foothills.

== History ==
=== Ancient history ===
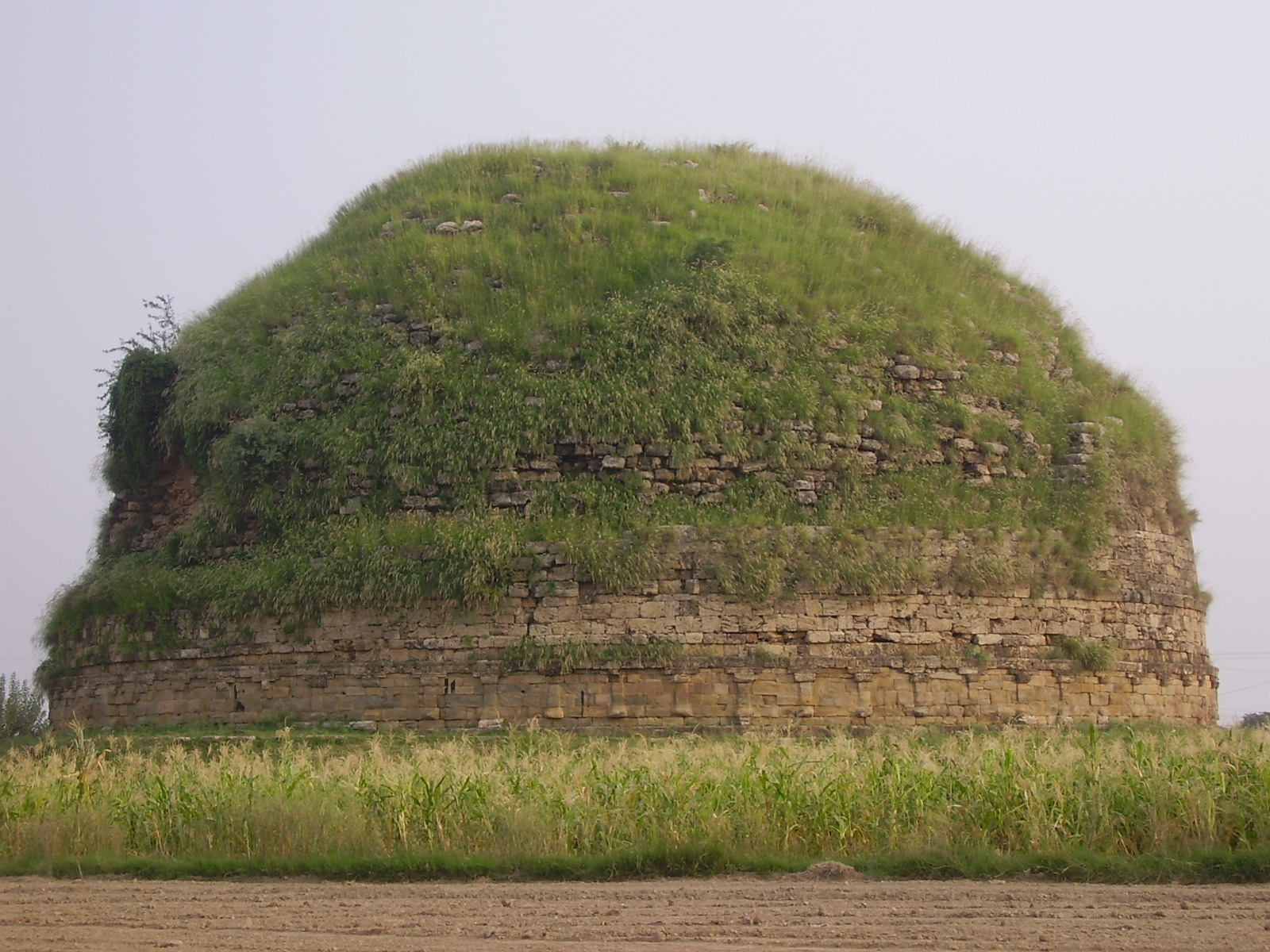
Mankiala Stupa 27 kilometres (17 mi) from Rawalpindi city

In ancient times the whole or the greater part of the area between the Indus and the Jhelum seems to have belonged to a Naga tribe called Takshakas, who gave their name to the city of Takshasila. Known as Taxila by the Greek historians, the location of the ancient city has been identified to be in the ruins of Shahdheri in the north-west corner of the District.

At the time of Alexander's invasion Taxila was described by Arrian as a flourishing city, known more for its tourism. Taxila having too weak army, locals of the city had immediately surrendered to Greek army without a battle; adds that the neighbouring country was crowded with inhabitants and was very fertile; and Pliny speaks of it as a famous city situated in a district called Amanda. The invasion of Demetrius in 195 B.C. brought the Punjab under the Graeco-Bactrian kings. Later they were superseded by the Sakas, who ruled at Taxila with the title of Satrap. At the time of Hiuen Tsiang (Chinese explorer), the city was a dependency of Kashmir.

=== Muslim era ===
Sultan Mahmud Ghaznavi passed through the District after his defeat of Anandpal and capture of Ohind. The first mention of the Gakhars occurs in the memoirs of Babar, who gives an interesting account of the capture of their capital, Paralah. It was strongly situated in the hills, and was defended with great bravery by its chief Hati Khan, who escaped from one gate as the Mughal army marched in at the other. Hati Khan died by poison in 1525; his cousin and murderer Sultan Sarang then submitted to Babar, who conferred on him the area of Potwar. From that time on the Gakhar chieftains remained firm allies of the Mughal dynasty, and provided significant aid to the Mughal in their struggle against the house of Sher Shah. Salim Shah attempted in vain to subdue their country.

In 1553 Adam Khan, Sarang's successor, surrendered the rebel prince Kamran to Humayun. Adam Khan was subsequently deposed by Akbar, and his principality given over to his nephew Kamal Khan. During the height of the Mughal empire, the family of Sarang retained its territorial possessions. Its last and Gakhars chief, Mukarrab Khan, ruled over a kingdom which extended from the Chenab to the Indus.

=== British era ===
In 1849 Rawalpindi passed with the rest of the Sikh dominions under British rule; and though tranquillity was disturbed by an insurrection four years later, led by a Gakhar chief with the object of placing a pretended son of Ranjit Singh on the throne, its administration was generally peaceful until the outbreak of the Mutiny in 1857. The Dhunds and other tribes of the Murree Hills, incited by Hindustani agents, rose in insurrection, and the authorities received information from a faithful native of a projected attack upon the station of Murree in time to organise measures for defence. The women near the station, who were present in large numbers, were placed in safety, while the Europeans and police were drawn up in a cordon round the station. The rebels arrived expecting no resistance, but were met with organised resistance and were repelled.

The district of Rawalpindi was created during British rule as part of Punjab province. The district obtained its current boundaries in 1904 when Attock District was created as a separate district. According to the 1901 census of India the population in 1901 was 558,699, an increase of 4.7% from 1891. During the period of British rule, Rawalpindi district increased in population and importance.

== Administrative division ==
Rawalpindi district is governed by the Rawalpindi Metropolitan Corporation and is divided into five tehsils.

Tehsil	Area (km^{2})	Population (2023)	Density (ppl/km^{2}) (2023)	Literacy rate (2023)
Gujar Khan	1,457	781,578	536.43	79.72%
Kahuta	637	237,843	373.38	84.05%
Kallar Syedan	459	242,709	528.78	82.23%
Rawalpindi	1,682	3,744,590	2,226.27	83.97%
Taxila	312	739,244	2,369.37	81.98%
Rawalpindi district	4,547	5,745,964	1,868.79%	83.06%

There are also two cantonments, which are run separately by the military.

- Rawalpindi Cantonment
- Chaklala Cantonment

== Demography ==
=== Population ===
Historical population
Year	Pop.	±% p.a.
1951	...	—
1961	...	—
1972	...	—
1981	...	—
1998	3,363,911	—
2017	5,402,380	+2.52%
2023	5,745,964	+1.03%

As of the 2023 census, Rawalpindi district had 931,813 households and a population of 5,745,964 which is roughly equal to the population of Cook County, Illinois, United States or Pudong New Area, Shanghai, China. The district had a sex ratio of 103.54 males to 100 females and a literacy rate of 83.05%: 87.63% for males and 78.28% for females. 1,279,536 (22.49% of the surveyed population) were under 10 years of age. 4,031,341 (70.15%) lived in urban areas.

According to the 1998 census of Pakistan, the population of the district was 3,363,911 of which 53.03% were urban, and is the second-most urbanised district in Punjab. The population was estimated to be 4.5 million in 2010.

=== Religion ===
Religion in Rawalpindi district (2023)
Religion	Percent
Islam	97.95%
Christianity	1.96%
Other or not stated	0.09%

According to the 2023 census Muslims were the overwhelming majority religion in Rawalpindi district with 98.05%, while Christians were 1.86% of the population, mainly concentrated in urban areas. Ahmadis and Hindus make up the remainder of the population.

Hindus form a very small minority of the district's population. There are 3 main Hindu temples in the district- Krishna Temple in Saddar Cantonment, Lal Kurti Temple, and the Valmiki Swamiji Mandir in Gracy lines.

Religion in contemporary Rawalpindi District
Religious group	1941		2017		2023	
Religious group	Pop.	%	Pop.	%	Pop.	%
Islam	550,219	78.05%	4,942,993	97.88%	5,572,243	97.95%
Hinduism (Note: 1931-1941: Including Ad-Dharmis)	80,849	11.47%	1,183	0.02%	1,004	0.02%
Sikhism	63,692	9.03%	—N/a	—N/a	192	0.00003%
Christianity	4,193	0.59%	101,935	2.02%	111,625	1.96%
Ahmadi	—N/a	—N/a	3,423	0.07%	2,380	0.04%
Others	6,002	0.86%	534	0.01%	1,265	0.03%
Total Population	704,955	100%	5,050,068	100%	5,688,709	100%
Note: 1941 census data is for Rawalpindi, Gujar Khan, and Kahuta tehsils of erstwhile Rawalpindi district of Punjab province, which roughly corresponds to contemporary Rawalpindi district. District and tehsil borders have changed since 1941.

Religious groups in Rawalpindi District (British Punjab province era)
Religious group	1881		1891		1901		1911		1921		1931		1941	
Religious group	Pop.	%	Pop.	%	Pop.	%	Pop.	%	Pop.	%	Pop.	%	Pop.	%
Islam	711,546	86.72%	768,368	86.61%	803,283	86.32%	458,101	83.62%	470,038	82.58%	524,965	82.76%	628,193	80%
Hinduism	86,162	10.5%	83,301	9.39%	86,269	9.27%	48,449	8.84%	57,185	10.05%	59,485	9.38%	82,478	10.5%
Sikhism	17,780	2.17%	27,470	3.1%	32,234	3.46%	31,839	5.81%	31,718	5.57%	41,265	6.51%	64,127	8.17%
Christianity	3,822	0.47%	7,105	0.8%	7,614	0.82%	8,320	1.52%	9,286	1.63%	7,486	1.18%	9,014	1.15%
Jainism	1,033	0.13%	888	0.1%	1,068	0.11%	1,028	0.19%	954	0.17%	1,077	0.17%	1,337	0.17%
Zoroastrianism	169	0.02%	56	0.01%	66	0.01%	64	0.01%	41	0.01%	65	0.01%	67	0.01%
Buddhism	0	0%	0	0%	0	0%	10	0%	0	0%	9	0%	13	0%
Judaism	—N/a	—N/a	2	0%	1	0%	16	0%	0	0%	5	0%	2	0%
Others	0	0%	4	0%	0	0%	0	0%	2	0%	0	0%	0	0%
Total population	820,512	100%	887,194	100%	930,535	100%	547,827	100%	569,224	100%	634,357	100%	785,231	100%
Note1: British Punjab province era district borders are not an exact match in the present-day due to various bifurcations to district borders — which since created new districts — throughout the historic Punjab Province region during the post-independence era that have taken into account population increases. Note2: Population decrease between 1901 and 1911 census due to creation of Attock district in 1904 by taking Talagang Tehsil from Jhelum District and Pindi Gheb, Fateh Jang and Attock Tehsils from Rawalpindi District.

Religion in the Tehsils of Rawalpindi District (1921)
Tehsil	Islam		Hinduism		Sikhism		Christianity		Jainism		Others (Note: Including Buddhism, Zoroastrianism, Judaism, Tribals, others, or not stated)		Total	
Tehsil	Pop.	%	Pop.	%	Pop.	%	Pop.	%	Pop.	%	Pop.	%	Pop.	%
Rawalpindi Tehsil	193,682	73.74%	44,162	16.81%	15,278	5.82%	8,577	3.27%	918	0.35%	39	0.01%	262,656	100%
Gujar Khan Tehsil	132,810	89.23%	5,594	3.76%	10,366	6.96%	66	0.04%	1	0%	0	0%	148,837	100%
Murree Tehsil	57,824	94.84%	1,902	3.12%	597	0.98%	643	1.05%	1	0%	2	0%	60,969	100%
Kahuta Tehsil	85,722	88.59%	5,527	5.71%	5,477	5.66%	2	0%	34	0.04%	0	0%	96,762	100%
Note: British Punjab province era tehsil borders are not an exact match in the present-day due to various bifurcations to tehsil borders — which since created new tehsils — throughout the historic Punjab Province region during the post-independence era that have taken into account population increases.

Religion in the Tehsils of Rawalpindi District (1941)
Tehsil	Islam		Hinduism		Sikhism		Christianity		Jainism		Others (Note: Including Anglo-Indian Christians, British Christians, Buddhism, Zoroastrianism, Judaism, Tribals, others, or not stated)		Total	
Tehsil	Pop.	%	Pop.	%	Pop.	%	Pop.	%	Pop.	%	Pop.	%	Pop.	%
Rawalpindi Tehsil	261,720	68.8%	68,389	17.98%	40,224	10.57%	4,095	1.08%	1,302	0.34%	4,665	1.23%	380,395	100%
Gujar Khan Tehsil	180,830	88.83%	6,781	3.33%	15,863	7.79%	94	0.05%	0	0%	0	0%	203,568	100%
Murree Tehsil	77,974	97.13%	1,629	2.03%	435	0.54%	19	0.02%	0	0%	219	0.27%	80,276	100%
Kahuta Tehsil	107,669	88.99%	5,679	4.69%	7,605	6.29%	4	0%	35	0.03%	0	0%	120,992	100%
Note1: British Punjab province era tehsil borders are not an exact match in the present-day due to various bifurcations to tehsil borders — which since created new tehsils — throughout the historic Punjab Province region during the post-independence era that have taken into account population increases. Note2: Tehsil religious breakdown figures for Christianity only includes local Christians, labeled as "Indian Christians" on census. Does not include Anglo-Indian Christians or British Christians, who were classified under "Other" category.

=== Language ===
Languages of Rawalpindi District (2023)
1. Punjabi (59.4%)
2. Urdu (17.0%)
3. Pashto (10.4%)
4. Hindko (3.90%)
5. Kashmiri (1.53%)
6. Saraiki (0.69%)
7. Sindhi (0.30%)
8. Others (6.78%)

The population of Rawalpindi is 6,058,540 in 2023. 3,434,400 spoke Punjabi, 1,007,836 Urdu, 623,084 Pashto, 140,837 Hindko, 86,817 Kashmiri, 39,482 Saraiki, 16,953 Sindhi, 9,733 Shina, 9,553 Kohistani, 7,538 Balti, 3,869 Balochi, 504 Mewati, 317 Brahui, 202 Kalasha & 307,925 Others. (Note: Those who chose 'Others' in the census are mainly speakers of Pahari)

At the time of the 2017 Census of Pakistan, 67.15% of the population spoke Punjabi, 11.51% Pashto, 10.64% Urdu, 3.25% Hindko and 1.89% Kashmiri as their first language. 4.22% of the population spoke languages classified as 'Others'.

== Education ==
According to the 2015 census, Rawalpindi was ranked number one district of Pakistan in terms of education and school infrastructure facilities. According to official 2014 Public Schools Census data, district Rawalpindi had a total of 1,230 primary, 316 middle, 365 secondary and 40 higher secondary schools. Out of these public sector schools, 911 are male schools while 1,040 are for girls. There were 4,279 teachers teaching at primary level while 3,129, 6,516 and 1,155 teachers are teaching at middle, secondary and higher secondary level, respectively. Out of these teachers, 9,788 are female while 5,291 are male. 24% of the Class 2 students could not read a story in Urdu, 26% could not read a sentence in English and 46% of Class 5 students could not do two digit divisions. 8% of the students dropped out of the school at the primary level.

== Agriculture ==
The principal crops were wheat, barley, maize, millets, and pulses. The district was traversed by the main line of the North-Western railway, crossing the Indus at Attock and also by a branch towards the Indus at Kushalgarh.

== Notable people ==
- Syed Asim Munir Ahmed Shah Current Chief of the Army Staff (COAS), Pakistan Army
- Raja Zafar-ul-Haq, Chairman PML N (Political Party), Opposition Leader in Senate, Former Leader of house in Senate, Former Federal Minister, Former Ambassador.
- Raja Pervaiz Ashraf, ex Prime Minister of Pakistan
- Gen. Ashfaq Pervez Kayani, ex Chief of the Army Staff (2007–2013)
- Gen. Tikka Khan, ex Chief of the Army Staff (1972–1976), Governor of East Pakistan (1971), Governor of Punjab (1988–1990)
- Chaudhry Nisar Ali Khan, ex Interior minister of Pakistan.
- Sheikh Rashid Ahmad, MNA, Former Minister for Interior of Pakistan
- Shoaib Akhtar, former Pakistan Cricketer, fastest bowler.
- Wajid Zia, Director General of the Federal Investigation Agency
- Sohail Tanvir, Pakistan Cricket Team player
- Gen. Zaheerul Islam, director general of the Inter-Services Intelligence of Pakistan
- Muhammad Mahfuz, Nishan-e-Haider (Highest Military Award)
- Bilquis Sheikh, Pakistani author
- Rohail Hyatt, Pakistani record producer, keyboardist, and composer.
- Swaran Lata (actress), Pakistani film actress
- Azhar Mahmood, Cricketer
- Najaf Shah, Cricketer
- Umar Amin, Cricketer
- Raja Muhammad Sarwar, Nishan-e-Haider (Highest Military Award)
- Mohammad Amir, Cricketer
- Sawar Muhammad Hussain Shaheed, Nishan-e-Haider (Highest Military Award)
- Khan Ghulam Sarwar Khan, Politician from Taxila, Former Federal Minister
- Mohammad Wasim, Cricketer
- Mohammad Akram, Cricketer
- Sawar Khan, Ex Vice Chief of the Army Staff
- Abdul Aziz Mirza, Chief of Naval Staff, ambassador to Saudi Arabia.
- Dada Amir Haider Khan - Communist leader of undivided India and later Pakistan
- Lt. Col (R) Muhammad Shabbir Awan, ex MPA PP2 Punjab Assembly Col Shabbir Awan joined PTI on 19 December 2013
- Tara Singh, Sikh Activist
- Virender Lal Chopra, an Indian biotechnologist, geneticist and agriculturalist, known to have contributed to the development of wheat production in India

== See also ==
- Tehsils of Punjab, Pakistan
- Districts of Pakistan
  - Districts of Punjab
  - Districts of Sindh
  - Districts of Khyber Pakhtunkhwa
  - Districts of Balochistan, Pakistan
  - Districts of Azad Kashmir
  - Districts of Gilgit-Baltistan
- Divisions of Pakistan
  - Divisions of Punjab, Pakistan
