= American Market =

American Market (also known as Sitara Market) is a market located in Peshawar, Pakistan. It sells various types of electronic goods and is notorious for giving its visitors the opportunity to purchase various firearms and accessories.

According to a local dealer, "the area has come to be known as the American Market because it sells US goods that have either been stolen and transported from Afghanistan, or from trucks captured from NATO transporting goods from Pakistan to Afghanistan." Even though being nicknamed the "American Market", this market sells "arms from the US, China, Russia, Iran and just about every other country you can think of".

After the withdrawal of United States troops from Afghanistan (2020–2021), the supply of contraband to the market has dwindled. As a result, the number of customers visiting it has significantly decreased.
