= List of members of the 8th Legislative Assembly of Azad Kashmir =

8th assembly of Azad Kashmir

8th Azad Kashmir Legislative Assembly آزاد کشمیراسمبلی

Leadership
- Speaker: Shah Ghulam Qadir; PML (N) since 30 July 2016
- Prime Minister: Farooq Haider Khan; PML (N) since 31 July 2016

Structure
- Seats: 49
- Political groups: Government (34): PML (N) (34); Opposition (14): PPP (5); MC (3); PTI (3); JI (2); Independent (1); JKPP (1)

Elections
- Voting system: First past the post
- Last election: 21 July 2016

Meeting place
- Muzaffarabad, Azad Kashmir

Website
- www.ajkassembly.gok.pk

General elections were held in Azad Kashmir on 21 July 2016 to elect 41 members of the Azad Kashmir Legislative Assembly. Polling started at 8:00am and continued till 5:00pm without any break.

== Members ==
Constituency	Political Party	Member
LA-1 Dadyal	PMLN	Masood Khalid Advocate
LA-2 Chakswari/Islamgarh	PPP	Chaudhry Abdul Majid
LA-3 Mirpur City	PTI	Sultan Mehmood Chaudhry
LA-4 Khari Sharif	PMLN	Chaudhry Rukhsar Ahmed
LA-5 Barnala	PMLN	Waqar Ahmed Noor
LA-6 Samahni	Independent	Ch. Ali Shan Soni
LA-7 Bhimber City	PMLN	Chaudhry Tariq Farooq
LA-8 Kotli City	MC	Malik Muhammad Nawaz Khan
LA-9 Nakyal Dist Kotli	PMLN	Sardar Farooq Sikander
LA-10 Sehnsa	PMLN	Raja Naseer Ahmed Khan
LA-11 Charhoi	PPP	Chaudhry Muhammad Yasin
LA-12 Khoiratta	PMLN	Raja Nisar Ahmed Khan
LA-13 Dheerkot	MC	Attique Ahmed Khan
LA-14 Wasti Bagh	PMLN	Mushtaq Minhas
LA-15 Sharqi Bagh	PMLN	Mir Akbar Khan
LA-16 Forward Kahuta Haveli	PMLN	Ch Muhammad Aziz
LA-17 Abbas Pur	PMLN	Ch Yasin Gulshan
LA-18 Hajeera	PMLN	Sardar Aamir Iltaf
LA-19 Rawlakot	JK Peoples Party	Sardar Hassan Ibrahim Khan
LA-20 Thorar	MC	Muhammad Sagheer Khan
LA-21 Palandri Sudhnoti	PMLN	Dr. Muhammad Najeeb Naqi Khan
LA-22 Baloch Sadhnoti	PMLN	Sardar Farooq Ahmed Tahir
LA-23 Athmuqam Neelum	PMLN	Shah Ghulam Qadir
LA-24 Pateeka	PMLN	Noreen Arif
LA-25 Lachrat	PMLN	Ch Shehzad Mehmood
LA-26 Muzaffarabad City	PMLN	Iftikhar Gilani
LA-27 Khawra	PMLN	Raja Abdul Qayyum Khan
LA-28 Chukar Hattian Bala	PMLN	Raja Farooq Haider Khan
LA-29 Leepa	PMLN	Mustafa Bashir Abbasi
LA-30 Jammu-1 Karachi/Punjab	PMLN	Nasir Hussain Dar
LA-31 Jammu-2 Gujranwala/Hafizabad	PMLN	Chaudhry Muhammad Ismail Gujjar
LA-32 Jammu-3 Sialkot	PMLN	Muhammad Ishaq
LA-33 Jammu-4 Narowal	PMLN	Mian Muhammad Yasir Rashid
LA-34 Jammu-5 Gujrat/M.B.Din/Wazirabad	PMLN	Ch. Javed Akhtar
LA-35 Jammu-6 Rawalpindi	PMLN	Raja Muhammad Siddique Khan
LA-36 Valley-1 Karachi	PPP	Amir Abdul Ghaffar Lone
LA-37 Valley-2 Lahore	PTI	Ghulam Mohy-ud-din Deewan
LA-38 Valley-3 Jhelum/Multan	PMLN	Syed Shaukat Ali Shah
LA-39 Valley-4 Rawalpindi	PMLN	Asad Aleem Shah
LA-40 Valley-5 Rawalpindi/Islamabad/Murree	PMLN	Muhammad Ahmed Raza Qadri
LA-41 Valley-6 Peshawar/Mansehra (KPK)	PTI	Abdul Majid Khan
Reserved seat	Reserved seat	Mrs.Riffat Aziz
Reserved seat	Reserved seat	Mrs. Sehrish Qamar
Reserved seat	Reserved seat	Mrs.Shazia Akbar Ch.
Reserved seat	Reserved seat	Mrs. Faiza Imtiaz
Reserved seat	Reserved seat	Mrs.Naseema Khatoon
Reserved seat	Reserved seat	Syed Muhammad Ali Raza Bukhari
Reserved seat	Reserved seat	Javed Iqbal
Reserved seat	Reserved seat	Abdul Rashid Turabi
