= Chaudhry Yasir Sultan =

Pakistani politician

- چوہدری یاسر سلطان

Member of the Azad Kashmir Legislative Assembly
- Incumbent
- Assumed office 15 November 2021
- Constituency: LA-3 Mirpur-III

Personal details
- Party: Pakistan People's Party (2025-present)
- Other political affiliations: Pakistan Tehreek-e-Insaf (2021-2025)
- Parent: Sultan Mehmood Chaudhry (father)

Chaudhry Yasir Sultan (Urdu: چوہدری یاسر سلطان) is a Pakistani politician who has been a member of the Azad Kashmir Legislative Assembly since November 2021. He is the son of Sultan Mehmood Chaudhry, the 5th Prime Minister of Azad Kashmir and 22nd President of Azad Kashmir.

== Political career ==
Sultan was elected to the Azad Kashmir Legislative Assembly from LA-3 Mirpur-III as a candidate of Pakistan Tehreek-e-Insaf (PTI) in an October 2021 by-election. He received 20,142 votes and defeated Chaudhry Muhammad Saeed, a candidate of Pakistan Muslim League (N) (PML(N)).

On 25 April 2022, he was sworn into the cabinet of Prime Minister Tanveer Ilyas Khan as the Minister for Physical Planning and Housing. He served in this position until the fall of Khan's government on 11 April 2023.

On 25 June 2023, he was sworn into the cabinet of Prime Minister Chaudhry Anwarul Haq as the Minister for Physical Planning and Housing. He served in this position until the fall of Haq's government on 17 November 2025.

On 26 October 2025, he joined Pakistan People's Party (PPP).

On 19 November 2025, he was sworn into the cabinet of Prime Minister Faisal Mumtaz Rathore as the Minister for Physical Planning and Housing.

He was re-elected to the Assembly from LA-3 Mirpur-III as a candidate of the Pakistan People's Party (PPP) in the 2026 Azad Kashmiri general election. He received 12,590 votes, while the runner-up, Chaudhry Muhammad Saeed of the PML(N), received 11,081 votes.
