= Mushtaq Minhas =

Kashmiri politician

Raja Mushtaq Ahmed Minhas
- مُشتاق احمد مِنہاس

Member of the Azad Kashmir Legislative Assembly
- In office 30 July 2016 – 3 August 2021
- Preceded by: Qamar uz Zaman Khan
- Succeeded by: Tanveer Ilyas Khan
- Constituency: LA-14 Bagh-II

Personal details
- Party: Pakistan Muslim League (N) (2016-present)

Raja Mushtaq Ahmed Minhas (Urdu: مُشتاق احمد مِنہاس)(Born 12 August 1970) is a Kashmiri politician who wass the Minister of Information, Tourism and Information Technology from August 2016 to August 2021. He was a member of the 8th Legislative Assembly of AJK, serving from July 2016 to August 2021.

== Career ==
=== Education ===
Mushtaq Minhas studied at Govt Boys High School Bagh ajk, Forman Christian College, in Lahore, from where he gained a Bachelor of Arts degree. He was also the vice-president of the Jamaat-e-Islami's students' union Islami Jamiat-e-Talaba. Mushtaq Minhas received Master of Arts degree in Mass Communication from University of the Punjab, Lahore, in 1992.

=== Journalism ===
Minhas was a member of the federal executive council of PFUJ (Pakistan Federal Union of Journalist) and a founder of the National Press Club Islamabad. He is also a former president of the Rawalpindi-Islamabad Press Club. However, he was named by a PFUJ investigation committee of swallowing a copy of the PFUJ elections result and causing mayhem.

He has worked with different leading news organisations as a reporter, senior reporter and chief reporter. He was elected as a secretary of Rawalpindi-Islamabad press club for six terms.

Minhas was co-host, along with Nusrat Javed, of Bolta Pakistan, a current affairs political talk show, on AAJ TV. He left the program to join BOL TV, but left shortly afterwards to join politics.

== Political career ==
Minhas joined the Pakistan Muslim League (N) in March 2016, after which he announced his intention to quit journalism.

He was elected to the Azad Kashmir Legislative Assembly from LA-14 Bagh-II as a candidate of PML(N) in the 2016 Azad Kashmiri general election. He received 25,944 votes and defeated Qamar uz Zaman Khan, a candidate of Pakistan People's Party (PPP).

On 6 August 2016, he was inducted into the cabinet of Prime Minister Raja Farooq Haider Khan and was made the Minister of Information, Tourism and Information Technology. On 7 November 2018, after a cabinet re-shuffle, he was made the Minister for Information and Tourism.

He contested the 2021 Azad Kashmiri general election from LA-15 Bagh-II as a candidate of PML(N), but was unsuccessful. He placed third and was defeated by Tanveer Ilyas Khan, a candidate of Pakistan Tehreek-e-Insaf (PTI).

He contested a June 2023 by-election from LA-15 Bagh-II as a candidate of PML(N), but was unsuccessful. He received 20,485 votes and was defeated by Ziaul Qamar, a candidate of PPP.

He contested the 2026 Azad Kashmiri general election from LA-15 Bagh-II as a candidate of PML(N), but was unsuccessful. He received 15,127 votes and was defeated by Ziaul Qamar, a candidate of PPP.

== Controversy ==
His act of posing with a shotgun on Twitter while reacting to the Indian Army Chief created a controversy, particularly since he was a serving minister. His act of swallowing the election results during elections to the journalism body was criticised by an investigation committee of Pakistan Federation of Unions of Journalists (PFUJ), which accused him of causing mayhem.
