= LA 15 =

LA 15, LA-15, La-15 or LA15 may refer to:

- Lavochkin La-15, a Cold War-era Soviet jet fighter aircraft
- LA15, a postcode district in South Cumbria within the LA postcode area
- Louisiana Highway 15, a north–south highway in central and northern Louisiana
- Louisiana's 15th State Senate district, a state senate district representing parts of northern East Baton Rouge Parish
- Louisiana's 15th House of Representatives District, a district in the Louisiana House of Representatives representing parts of Ouachita Parish
- Los Angeles City Council District 15, representing the Los Angeles Harbor and Shoestring districts
- Constituency LA-15, a constituency of the Azad Jammu and Kashmir Legislative Assembly in Pakistan
