= Mian Abdul Waheed =

Pakistani politician

- میاں عبدالوحید

Member of the Azad Kashmir Legislative Assembly
- Incumbent
- Assumed office 3 August 2021
- Preceded by: Shah Ghulam Qadir
- Constituency: LA-26 Neelum-II
- In office 24 July 2006 – 30 July 2016
- Succeeded by: Shah Ghulam Qadir
- Constituency: LA-23 Neelum

Personal details
- Party: Pakistan People's Party

Mian Abdul Waheed (Urdu: میاں عبدالوحید) is a Pakistani politician who has been a member of the Azad Kashmir Legislative Assembly since August 2021. He was previously a member of the Assembly from July 2006 to July 2016.

== Political career ==
Waheed was elected to the Azad Kashmir Legislative Assembly from LA-23 Neelum as a candidate of Pakistan People's Party (PPP) in the 2006 Azad Kashmiri general election.

He was re-elected to the Assembly from LA-23 Neelum as a candidate of PPP in the 2011 Azad Kashmiri general election.

On 2 August 2011, he was sworn into the cabinet of Prime Minister Chaudhry Abdul Majid, and was made the Minister for Schools and Education.

He contested the 2016 Azad Kashmiri general election from LA-23 Neelum as a candidate of PPP, but was unsuccessful. He received 18,675 votes and was defeated by Shah Ghulam Qadir, a candidate of Pakistan Muslim League (N) (PML(N)).

He was re-elected to the Assembly from LA-26 Neelum-II as a candidate of PPP in the 2021 Azad Kashmiri general election. He received 18,870 votes and defeated Raja Muhammad Ilyas Khan, a candidate of Pakistan Tehreek-e-Insaf (PTI). In the same election, he contested from LA-25 Neelum-I as a candidate of PPP, but was unsuccessful. He received 12,400 votes and was defeated by Shah Ghulam Qadir, a candidate of PML(N).

On 25 June 2023, he was sworn into the cabinet of Prime Minister Chaudhry Anwarul Haq as the Minister for Law, Justice, Parliamentary Affairs and Human Rights. He served in this position until the fall of Haq's government on 17 November 2025.

On 19 November 2025, he was sworn into the cabinet of Prime Minister Faisal Mumtaz Rathore as the Minister for Law, Justice, Parliamentary Affairs and Human Rights.

He was re-elected to the Assembly from LA-26 Neelum-II as a candidate of PPP in the 2026 Azad Kashmiri general election. He received 16,524 votes, while the runner-up, Shah Ghulam Qadir of PML(N), received 14,501 votes. In the same election, he contested from LA-25 Neelum-I as a candidate of PPP, but was unsuccessful. He received 13,836 votes and was defeated by Shah Ghulam Qadir, a candidate of PML(N).
