= Ziaul Qamar =

Pakistani politician

- سردار ضیاء القمر

Member of the Azad Jammu and Kashmir Legislative Assembly
- Incumbent
- Assumed office 12 June 2023
- Preceded by: Sardar Tanveer Ilyas
- Constituency: LA-15 Bagh-II

Personal details
- Born: Azad Kashmir, Pakistan
- Citizenship: Pakistan
- Party: PPP (2011-present)

Sardar Ziaul Qamar is a politician from Azad Jammu and Kashmir (AJK) and a member of the Pakistan People's Party (PPP). He has been a member of the Azad Jammu and Kashmir Legislative Assembly since June 2023. He was elected in a by-election on 8 June 2023 from LA-15 Bagh-II, securing 25,755 votes. He succeeded the former Prime Minister of Azad Kashmir Sardar Tanveer Ilyas, who was disqualified by the High Court of Azad Jammu and Kashmir for contempt of court.

== Political career ==
He contested the 2011 Azad Kashmiri general election from LA-15 Bagh-III as a candidate of the Pakistan People's Party (PPP), but was unsuccessful. He received 18,271 votes and was defeated by Sardar Mir Akbar Khan, a candidate of the All Jammu and Kashmir Muslim Conference (AJKMC).

He contested the 2016 Azad Kashmiri general election from LA-15 Bagh-III as a candidate of the PPP, but was unsuccessful. He received 16,439 votes and was defeated by Sardar Mir Akbar Khan, a candidate of the Pakistan Muslim League (N) (PML(N)).

He contested the 2021 Azad Kashmiri general election from LA-15 Bagh-II as a candidate of the PPP, but was unsuccessful. He received 14,588 votes and was defeated by Sardar Tanveer Ilyas, a candidate of the Pakistan Tehreek-e-Insaf (PTI).

He was elected to the Azad Jammu and Kashmir Legislative Assembly as a candidate of the PPP in a June 2023 by-election held in LA-15 Bagh-II due to Ilyas' disqualification. He received 25,755 votes and defeated Mushtaq Ahmed Minhas, a candidate of the PML(N).

On 19 November 2025, he was sworn into the cabinet of Prime Minister Faisal Mumtaz Rathore as the Minister for Communications and Works.

He was re-elected to the Assembly from LA-15 Bagh-II as a candidate of PPP in the 2026 Azad Kashmiri general election. He received 17,018 votes and defeated Mushtaq Ahmed Minhas, a candidate of PML(N).
