= Riffat Aziz =

Pakistani-Kashmiri politician

Member of Azad Kashmir Legislative Assembly
- In office 29 July 2016 – 25 July 2021

Personal details
- Party: Jamaat-e-Islami Kashmir

Riffat Aziz is a Pakistani-Kashmiri politician who was a member of Azad Kashmir Legislative Assembly from 2016 to 2021. Riffat Aziz belongs to Jamaat-e-Islami Azad Jammu & Kashmir and was elected in 2016's elections as a member of the Legislative Assembly of Azad Kashmir on a reserved seat for women from Kotli, Azad Jammu and Kashmir.

== See also ==
- List of members of the 8th Legislative Assembly of Azad Kashmir
