= LA-7 Bhimber-III =

Electoral district in Azad Jammu and Kashmir

- Constituency for the Azad Kashmir Legislative Assembly
- District: Bhimber District
- Electorate: 130,000

Current constituency
- Party: Pakistan Muslim league (N)
- Member: Chaudhary Tariq Farooq

LA-7 Bhimber-III is a constituency of the Azad Kashmir Legislative Assembly which is currently represented by Chaudhary Tariq Farooq of the Pakistan Muslim League (N) (PTI). It covers the area of Bhimber in Bhimber District.

== Election 2016 ==
General elections were held on 21 July 2016.

General elections 2016: LA-7 Bhimber-III
Party	Candidate	Votes	%	±%
PML(N)	Chaudhry Tariq Farooq	30,339		
Independent	Chaudhry Anwarul Haq	27,676		
PTI	Inam Ul Haq	1,607		
PPP	Muhammad Imtiaz Khan	1,446		
Independent	Riaz Ahmed	1,120		
AJKMC	Muhammad Mustafa	810		
Independent	Raja Mazhar Iqbal	124		
Independent	Muhammad Ilyas Taimor	119		
Independent	Raja Azhar Iqbao	96		
Independent	Abid Zubair	75		
Independent	Chaudry Muhammad Saeed	63		
Independent	Qayyum Yousif	54		
Sunni Ittehad Council	Raja Muhammad Rafiq	54		
Independent	Chaudry Muhammad Najeeb	23		
Independent	Muhammad Arif Sarfaraz	15		
Turnout		63,627		

== Election 2021 ==
General elections were held on 25 July 2021.

General elections 2021: LA-7 Bhimber-III
Party	Candidate	Votes	%	±%
PTI	Chaudhry Anwarul Haq	38,303	49.13	
PML(N)	Chaudhry Tariq Farooq	32,245	41.36	
TLP	Muhammad Zubair	3,804	4.88	
JI	Riaz Ahmed	1,133	1.45	
Others	Others (twenty candidates)	2,482	3.18	
Turnout		77,967	69.60	
Majority		6,058	7.77	
Registered electors		112,029		
PTI gain from PML(N)				

== Election 2026 ==
General elections were held on 27 July 2026. Chaudhry Tariq Farooq of Pakistan Muslim League (N) (PML(N)) won the election with 37,613 votes.

General elections 2026: LA-7 Bhimber-III
Party	Candidate	Votes	%	±%
PML(N)	Chaudhry Tariq Farooq	37,613	51.16	▲9.80
Independent	Chaudhry Anwarul Haq	25,534	34.73	
Independent	Asif Mehmood	4,355	5.92	
JI	Abdul Sattar	2,886	3.93	▲0.75
Others	Others (twenty four candidates)	3,132	4.26	
Turnout		75,414	58.01	▼11.59
Total valid votes		73,520	97.49	
Rejected ballots		1,894	2.51	
Majority		12,079	16.43	
Registered electors		129,994		
PML(N) gain from PTI				
