= Mir Akbar Khan =

Pakistani politician

Sardar Mir Akbar Khan
- سردار میر اکبر خان

Member of the Azad Kashmir Legislative Assembly
- Incumbent
- Assumed office 25 July 2011
- Preceded by: Qamar-uz-Zaman Khan
- Constituency: LA-16 Bagh-III (2021-present); LA-15 Bagh-III (2011-2021)
- In office 24 July 2001 – 24 July 2006
- Succeeded by: Qamar-uz-Zaman Khan
- Constituency: LA-15 Bagh-III

Personal details
- Party: Pakistan Muslim League (N) (2016-2021; 2025-present)
- Other political affiliations: All Jammu and Kashmir Muslim Conference (2001-2016); Pakistan Tehreek-e-Insaf (2021-2025)

Sardar Mir Akbar Khan (Urdu: سردار میر اکبر خان) is a Pakistani politician who has been a member of the Azad Kashmir Legislative Assembly since July 2011. He previously served as a member of the Assembly from July 2001 to July 2006.

== Political career ==
Khan was elected to the Azad Kashmir Legislative Assembly from LA-15 Bagh-III as a candidate of All Jammu and Kashmir Muslim Conference (AJKMC) in the 2001 Azad Kashmiri general election.

In July 2001, he was sworn into the cabinet of Prime Minister Sikandar Hayat Khan as the Minister for Electricity and the Hydroelectric Board. Following a cabinet re-shuffle on 24 November 2004, he was made the Minister for Electricity.

He was re-elected to the Assembly from LA-15 Bagh-III as a candidate of AJKMC in the 2011 Azad Kashmiri general election. Following re-polling held at 10 polling stations, he received 19,217 votes and defeated Qamar-uz-Zaman Khan, a candidate of Pakistan People's Party (PPP).

He was re-elected to the Assembly from LA-15 Bagh-III as a candidate of Pakistan Muslim League (N) (PML(N)) in the 2016 Azad Kashmiri general election.

On 6 August 2016, he was sworn into the cabinet of Prime Minister Raja Farooq Haider Khan, and was made the Minister for Forests, Wildlife and Fisheries. After a cabinet re-shuffle on 7 November 2018, he was made the Minister for Forests.

On 18 June 2021, he joined Pakistan Tehreek-e-Insaf (PTI). He also resigned from the cabinet and the Assembly

He was re-elected to the Assembly from LA-16 Bagh-III as a candidate of PTI in the 2021 Azad Kashmiri general election. Following re-polling held at 4 polling stations, he received 23,561 votes and defeated Qamar-uz-Zaman Khan, a candidate of PPP.

On 26 August 2021, he was sworn into the cabinet of Prime Minister Abdul Qayyum Khan Niazi as the Minister for Agriculture, Animal Husbandry, Dairy Development, Irrigation and Small Dams. He served in this position until the fall of Niazi's government on 14 April 2022.

On 25 April 2022, he was sworn into the cabinet of Prime Minister Tanveer Ilyas Khan as the Minister for Agriculture, Animal Husbandry, Dairy Development, Irrigation and Small Dams. He served in this position until the fall of Khan's government on 11 April 2023.

On 25 June 2023, he was sworn into the cabinet of Prime Minister Chaudhry Anwarul Haq as the Minister for Agriculture and Livestock. He served in this position until the fall of Haq's government on 17 November 2025.

On 22 July 2025, an election tribunal nullified his election, citing "widespread irregularities, procedural violations and electoral fraud". On 1 August, the Supreme Court of Azad Jammu and Kashmir suspended the tribunal's decision.

On 22 December 2025, he re-joined PML(N).

He was re-elected to the Assembly from LA-16 Bagh-III as a candidate of PML(N) in the 2026 Azad Kashmiri general election. Following re-polling at 14 polling stations, he received 20,793 votes, and defeated Qamar-uz-Zaman Khan, a candidate of PPP.

On 4 September 2026, he was sworn into the cabinet of Prime Minister Ifitikhar Gilani.
