= Nusrat Javed =

TV and print journalist

- Born: 14 March 1954 (age 72)
- Occupations: Columnist, journalist and anchor
- Known for: Bolta Pakistan TV show

Nusrat Javed (Urdu: نُصرت جاوید), is a Pakistani columnist, journalist and a former news anchor.

== Early life and career ==
Nusrat Javed was born on 14 March 1954.

Javed began his television career with his program Bolta Pakistan on AAJ TV in 2007. He and his co-host, Mushtaq Minhas, then moved to Dunya TV to host the talk show Dunya Mere Agay, which followed the same format as Bolta Pakistan, but later came back to AAJ TV to resume Bolta Pakistan. He hosted another show as a news anchor on Public News in 2019, and after that he had concentrated on writings columns from 2019 to 2023. Nusrat Javed is known for his reporting on parliamentary affairs titled "Notes from the Press Gallery."

Javed used to co-host the show Bolta Pakistan on AAJ TV with Mushtaq Minhas. He also writes columns in Urdu and English for an Urdu daily newspaper Nawa-i-Waqt and The Nation respectively. On 22 January 2015, Nusrat Javed joined BOL News as Executive Vice President & Senior Anchorperson. Javed was the first Pakistani reporter to cover Indian elections in 1984 and since then, he has covered all elections held in Pakistan as well as India. He also has extensive experience in coverage of the conflict zones, including Iraq, Lebanon and Afghanistan.

His second last television programme was called Baharhall with host Aniq Naji and Mishal Bukhari on AAP TV. After this talk show, he returned to full-time column writing again from 2019 to 2023. From 2023 onwards, he has been hosting programme Khabar Nashar on Public News.

== TV shows ==
He has worked on the following shows:

- Bolta Pakistan (Aaj TV) 2008-2013
- Dunya Mere Aagay (Dunya TV) 2013-2016
- Bol Bol Pakistan (Dawn TV) 2016-2018
- Baharhall (AAP TV) 2018-2019
- Khabar Nashar (Public News) 2023-present

He left Dunya News in 2016 to join Dawn News to present the talk show Bol Bol Pakistan hosted by Gulmeenay Sethi. However, the show was taken off air in November 2018 citing financial reasons, though industry experts viewed it otherwise referring to the episode as another incident where media houses were pressurised to take off programs considered unfavourable to the ruling government and the state.

His second last television programme was called Baharhall with host Aniq Naji and Mishal Bukhari on AAP TV. After this talk show, he returned to full-time column writing again from 2019 to 2023. From 2023 onwards, he has been hosting programme Khabar Nashar on Public News.
