= LA-15 Bagh-II =

Electoral district in Azad Jammu and Kashmir

- Constituency for the Azad Kashmir Legislative Assembly
- District: Bagh District
- Electorate: 101,145

Current constituency
- Party: Pakistan People's Party
- Member: Ziaul Qamar
- Created from: LA-14 Bagh-II

LA-15 Bagh-II is a constituency of the Azad Kashmir Legislative Assembly which is currently represented by Ziaul Qamar of Pakistan People's Party (PPP). It covers the area of Hari Ghel Tehsil in Bagh District.

== Election 2016 ==
General elections were held on 21 July 2016.

General election 2016: LA-14 Bagh-II
Party	Candidate	Votes	%	±%
PML(N)	Mushtaq Minhas	25,944	50.93	
PTI	Khursheed Ahmed Khan	13,409	26.32	
PPP	Sardar Qamar Zaman Khan	9,267	18.19	
JUI (F)	Atta Ur Rehman	1,841	3.61	
Muttahida Kashmir Peoples National Party	Shazia Akbar	267	0.52	
Independent	Muhammad Siyad Rafiq	152	0.30	
Independent	Abid Shaheen	37	0.07	
MWM	Muhammad Ayaz Tahir	26	0.05	
Turnout		50,943		

== Election 2021 ==
General elections were held on 25 July 2021.

General election 2021: LA-15 Bagh-II
Party	Candidate	Votes	%	±%
PTI	Tanveer Ilyas Khan	19,825	34.03	▲7.78
PPP	Ziaul Qamar	14,558	24.99	▲6.80
PML(N)	Mushtaq Minhas	11,076	19.01	▼31.92
AJKMC	Raja Muhammad Yaseen Khan	9,964	17.10	▲17.10
JUI (F)	Abdul Rasheed	1,210	2.08	▼1.53
TLP	Masood Hayat Qadri	1,000	1.72	▲1.72
Others	Others (eighteen candidates)	624	1.07	
Turnout		58,257	60.33	
Majority		5,267	9.04	
Registered electors		96,561		
PTI gain from PML(N)				

== By-election 2023 ==
A by-election was held on 8 June 2023 due to the disqualification of Tanveer Ilyas Khan, the previous MLA from this seat.

By-election 2023: LA-15 Bagh-II
Party	Candidate	Votes	%	±%
PPP	Ziaul Qamar	25,755	48.51	▲23.52
PML(N)	Mushtaq Minhas	20,485	38.59	▲19.58
PTI	Raja Muhammad Zameer Khan	4,942	9.31	▼24.72
JUI (F)	Attique Ahmed	773	1.46	▼0.62
TLP	Masood Hayat	652	1.23	▼0.49
AJKMC	Zulfiqar Ahmed Khan	263	0.50	▼16.60
Others	Others (thirteen candidates)	213	0.40	
Turnout		53,083	52.48	▼7.85
Majority		5,270	9.93	
Registered electors		101,145		
PPP gain from PTI				

== Election 2026 ==
General elections were held on 10 August 2026. Ziaul Qamar won the election with 17,018 votes.

General election 2026: LA-15 Bagh-II
Party	Candidate	Votes	%	±%
PPP	Ziaul Qamar	17,018	36.90	▼11.61
PML(N)	Mushtaq Minhas	15,127	32.80	▼5.79
JI	Muhammad Khan	12,291	26.65	
IPP	Tanveer Ilyas Khan	1,220	2.65	
Others	Others (twenty-six candidates)	461	1.00	
Turnout		46,799	40.72	▼11.76
Total valid votes		46,117	98.54	
Rejected ballots		682	1.46	
Majority		1,891	4.10	
Registered electors		114,937		
PPP hold				
