= LA-25 Neelum-I =

Constituency of the Azad Kashmir Legislative Assembly

- Constituency for the Azad Kashmir Legislative Assembly
- District: Neelum District
- Electorate: 64,231

Current constituency
- Party: Pakistan Muslim League (N)
- Member: Shah Ghulam Qadir
- Created from: LA-23 Neelum

LA-25 Neelum-I is a constituency of the Azad Kashmir Legislative Assembly which is currently represented by Shah Ghulam Qadir of the Pakistan Muslim League (N) (PML(N)). It covers the area of Athmuqam Tehsil of Neelum District.

== Election 2016 ==
General elections were held on 21 July 2016.

General election 2016: LA-23 Neelum
Party	Candidate	Votes	%	±%
PML(N)	Shah Ghulam Qadir	40,010		
PPP	Abdul Waheed	18,675		
PTI	Ikhlaq Rasool	4,791		
AJKMC	Mansoor Ur Rehman	4,712		
Independent	Qazi Ghulam Sarwar	247		
Independent	Mian Muhammad Asif	191		
Independent	Syed Naseer Kazmi	74		
Independent	Muhammad Altaf Shah	62		
Turnout		68,792		

== Election 2021 ==
General elections were held on 25 July 2021.

General election 2021: LA-25 Neelum-I
Party	Candidate	Votes	%	±%
PML(N)	Shah Ghulam Qadir	14,341	33.24	
PPP	Mian Abdul Waheed	12,400	28.74	
PTI	Sardar Gul Khandan	11,807	27.37	
AJKMC	Shafiq ur Rehman	1,352	3.13	
JI	Muhammad Altaf Kashmiri	1,178	2.73	
TLP	Muhammad Ayub Sheikh	1,076	2.49	
Others	Others (fourteen candidates)	989	2.29	
Turnout		43,143	67.17	
Majority		1,941	4.50	
Registered electors		64,231		
PML(N) hold				

== Election 2026 ==
Elections were held on 2 August 2026. Shah Ghulam Qadir won the election with 19,201 votes.

General election 2026: LA-25 Neelum-I
Party	Candidate	Votes	%	±%
PML(N)	Shah Ghulam Qadir	19,201	46.33	▲13.09
PPP	Mian Abdul Waheed	13,836	33.38	▲4.64
IPP	Tanveer Ilyas Khan	3,348	8.08	
AJKMC	Abid Afzal	2,604	6.28	▲3.15
JI	Habibullah Butt	923	2.23	▼0.50
Others	Others	1,532	3.70	
Turnout		42,312	52.73	▼14.44
Total valid votes		41,444	97.95	
Rejected ballots		868	2.05	
Majority		5,365	12.95	
Registered electors		80,239		
PML(N) hold				
