= LA-26 Neelum-II =

Constituency of the Azad Kashmir Legislative Assembly

- Constituency for the Azad Kashmir Legislative Assembly
- District: Neelum District
- Electorate: 58,970

Current constituency
- Party: Pakistan People's Party
- Member: Mian Abdul Waheed
- Created from: LA-23 Neelum

LA-26 Neelum-II is a constituency of the Azad Kashmir Legislative Assembly which is currently represented by Mian Abdul Waheed of the Pakistan People's Party (PPP). It covers the area of Sharda Tehsil of Neelum District.

== Election 2021 ==
General elections were held on 25 July 2021.

General election 2021: LA-26 Neelum-II
Party	Candidate	Votes	%	±%
PPP	Mian Abdul Waheed	18,870	44.48	
PTI	Raja Muhammad Ilyas Khan	13,294	31.34	
PML(N)	Raja Muhammad Bashir Khan	3,210	7.57	
Independent	Seraj Din	2,947	6.95	
TLP	Mian Muhammad Khabib	1,402	3.30	
Others	Others (thirteen candidates)	2,701	6.37	
Turnout		42,424	71.94	
Majority		5,576	13.14	
Registered electors		58,970		
PPP win (new seat)				

== Election 2026 ==
Elections were held on 2 August 2026. Mian Abdul Waheed won the election with 16,524 votes.

General election 2026: LA-26 Neelum-II
Party	Candidate	Votes	%	±%
PPP	Mian Abdul Waheed	16,524	41.51	▼2.97
PML(N)	Shah Ghulam Qadir	14,501	36.42	▲28.85
IPP	Syed Saqlain Haider Kazmi	5,135	12.90	
JI	Sajid Hussain	1,213	3.05	
Independent	Naseer ud din	352	0.88	
Others	Others	2,086	5.24	
Turnout		40,479	56.48	▼15.46
Total valid votes		39,811	98.35	
Rejected ballots		668	1.65	
Majority		2,023	5.09	
Registered electors		71,672		
PPP hold				
