= Muhammad Yasin Lone =

Pakistani politician

- محمد یٰسین لون

Member of the Azad Kashmir Legislative Assembly
- Incumbent
- Assumed office 24 August 2026
- Preceded by: Javed Butt
- Constituency: LA-43 Kashmir Valley-IV

Personal details
- Party: Pakistan Muslim League (N)

Muhammad Yasin Lone (Urdu: محمد یٰسین لون) is a Pakistani politician who has been a member of the Azad Kashmir Legislative Assembly since August 2026.

== Political career ==
Lone was elected to the Azad Kashmir Legislative Assembly from LA-43 Kashmir Valley-IV as a candidate of the Pakistan Muslim League (N) (PML(N)) in the 2026 Azad Kashmiri general election. He received 1,276 votes, while the runner-up, Javed Butt of the Pakistan People's Party, received 563 votes.
