= LA-16 Bagh-III =

Electoral district in Azad Jammu and Kashmir

- Constituency for the Azad Kashmir Legislative Assembly
- District: Bagh District
- Electorate: 87,814

Current constituency
- Party: Pakistan Muslim League (N)
- Member: Mir Akbar Khan

LA-16 Bagh-III is a constituency of the Azad Kashmir Legislative Assembly which is currently represented by Mir Akbar Khan of the Pakistan Muslim League (N) (PML(N)). It covers the area of Bagh Tehsil in Bagh District.

== Election 2016 ==
General elections were held on 21 July 2016.

General election 2016: LA-15 Bagh-III
Party	Candidate	Votes	%	±%
PML(N)	Mir Akbar Khan	25,461	55.86	
PPP	Ziaul Qamar	16,439	36.06	
AJKMC	Sardar Manzoor Hussain Khan	2,609	5.72	
Independent	Syed Ishfaq Hussain Shah	633	1.39	
Independent	Muhammad Taimor Khan	226	0.50	
Muttahida Kashmir Peoples National Party	Syeda Salma Fatimah	214	0.47	
Turnout		45,582		

== Election 2021 ==
General elections were held on 25 July 2021.

General election 2021: LA-16 Bagh-III
Party	Candidate	Votes	%	±%
PTI	Mir Akbar Khan	23,563	41.46	▲41.46
PPP	Qamar uz Zaman Khan	23,267	40.94	▲4.88
PML(N)	Ijaz Ahmad	3,536	6.22	▼49.64
AJKMC	Javed Khalid Abbasi	3,258	5.73	▲0.01
Others	Others (thirteen candidates)	3,204	5.64	
Turnout		56,828	64.71	
Majority		296	0.52	
Registered electors		87,814		
PTI gain from PML(N)				

== Election 2026 ==
General elections were held on 10 August 2026. Mir Akbar Khan won the election with 20,793 votes.

General election 2026: LA-16 Bagh-III
Party	Candidate	Votes	%	±%
PML(N)	Mir Akbar Khan	20,793	50.81	▲44.59
PPP	Qamar uz Zaman Khan	16,964	41.45	▲0.51
IPP	Ijaz Ahmed	1,012	2.47	
Others	Others (seventeen candidates)	2,158	5.27	
Turnout		42,017	39.37	▼25.34
Total valid votes		40,927	97.41	
Rejected ballots		1,090	2.59	
Majority		3,829	9.36	
Registered electors		106,721		
PML(N) gain from PTI				
