= LA-3 Mirpur-III =

Electoral district in Azad Jammu and Kashmir

- Constituency for the Azad Kashmir Legislative Assembly
- District: Mirpur District
- Electorate: 59,494

Current constituency
- Party: Pakistan Tehreek-e-Insaf
- Member: Yasir Sultan Chaudhry

LA-3 Mirpur-III is a constituency of the Azad Kashmir Legislative Assembly which is currently represented by Yasir Sultan Chaudhry of the Pakistan Tehreek-e-Insaf. It covers the area of Mirpur city in Mirpur District.

== Election 2016 ==
General elections were held on 21 July 2016.

General election 2016: LA-3 Mirpur-III
Party	Candidate	Votes	%	±%
PML(N)	Muhammad Saeed	19,514	52.66	
PTI	Sultan Mehmood Chaudhry	16,397	44.25	
Independent	Jahanzaib Akhtar	823	2.22	
Independent	Muhammad Afzal Mirza	125	0.34	
PPP	Chaudhry Muhammad Ashraf	100	0.27	
JUI (F)	Muhammad Ikhlaq Jazbi	55	0.15	
Independent	Yasir Sultan Chaudhry	43	0.12	
Turnout		37,057		

== By-election 2019 ==
A by-election was held on 24 November 2019 due to the disqualification of Muhammad Saeed, the former MLA from this seat, by the Supreme Court of Azad Jammu and Kashmir. Sultan Mehmood Chaudhry of Pakistan Tehreek-e-Insaf (PTI) won the election with 17,673 votes.

By-election 2019: LA-3 Mirpur-III
Party	Candidate	Votes	%	±%
PTI	Sultan Mehmood Chaudhry	17,673	50.82	▲6.57
PML(N)	Chaudhry Sohaib Saeed	14,813	42.60	▼10.06
TLP	Muhammad Shafiq-ur-Rehman	1,393	4.01	▲4.01
Others	Others (eleven candidates)	896	3.75	
Turnout		34,775	58.45	
Majority		2,860	8.22	
Registered electors		59,494		
PTI gain from PML(N)				

== Election 2021 ==
General elections were held on 25 July 2021.

General election 2021: LA-3 Mirpur-III
Party	Candidate	Votes	%	±%
PTI	Sultan Mehmood Chaudhry	18,703	43.51	▼7.31
PML(N)	Muhammad Saeed	15,556	36.19	▼6.41
TLP	Umair Asghar	5,731	13.33	▲9.32
PPP	Chaudhry Muhammad Ashraf	1,384	3.22	
Others	Others (nineteen candidates)	1,611	3.75	
Turnout		42,985	50.03	
Majority		3,147	7.32	
Registered electors		85,917		
PTI hold				

== By-election 2021 ==
A by-election was held on 10 October 2021 due to the resignation of Sultan Mehmood Chaudhry, the previous MLA from this seat, as he was elected to the office of President of Azad Kashmir. Chaudhry Yasir Sultan, his son, won the election with 20,142 votes.

By-election 2021: LA-3 Mirpur-III
Party	Candidate	Votes	%	±%
PTI	Chaudhry Yasir Sultan	20,142	54.09	▲10.58
PML(N)	Muhammad Saeed	11,608	31.17	▼5.02
TLP	Umair Asghar	3,843	10.32	▼3.01
PPP	Chaudhry Muhammad Ashraf	1,450	3.89	▲0.67
Others	Others (eight candidates)	195	0.52	
Total valid votes		37,238	99.36	
Rejected ballots		238	0.64	
Turnout		37,476	43.61	▼6.42
Majority		8,534	22.92	▲15.60
Registered electors		85,925		
PTI hold				

== Election 2026 ==
General elections were held on 27 July 2026. Chaudhry Yasir Sultan of Pakistan People's Party (PPP) won the election with 12,590 votes.

General election 2026: LA-3 Mirpur-III
Party	Candidate	Votes	%	±%
PPP	Chaudhry Yasir Sultan	12,590	41.35	▲37.46
PML(N)	Chaudhry Muhammad Saeed	11,081	36.40	▲5.23
IPP	Tasleem Arif	2,776	9.12	
Independent	Moiz Majeed	2,263	7.43	
Others	Others (Twenty nine candidates)	1,735	5.70	
Turnout		32,008	29.98	▼13.63
Total valid votes		30,445	95.12	
Rejected ballots		1,563	4.88	
Majority		1,509	4.95	
Registered electors		106,757		
PPP gain from PTI				
