= Shah Ghulam Qadir =

Pakistani politician

- شاہ غلام قادر

Leader of the Opposition in the Azad Kashmir Legislative Assembly
- In office 1 December 2025 – 28 August 2026
- Preceded by: Khawaja Farooq Ahmed
- Succeeded by: Chaudhry Muhammad Yasin

Speaker of the Azad Kashmir Legislative Assembly
- In office 30 July 2016 – 3 August 2021
- Preceded by: Muhammad Sayab Khalid Khan
- Succeeded by: Chaudhry Anwarul Haq
- In office 24 July 2006 – 12 August 2010
- Preceded by: Sardar Ghulam Sadiq
- Succeeded by: Chaudhry Anwarul Haq

Member of the Azad Kashmir Legislative Assembly
- Incumbent
- Assumed office 30 July 2016
- Preceded by: Mian Abdul Waheed
- Constituency: LA-23 Neelum (2016-2021); LA-25 Neelum-I (2021-present)
- In office 1998 – 25 July 2011
- Preceded by: Iqbal Razzaq Butt
- Succeeded by: Syed Azhar Hussain Gilani
- Constituency: LA-38 Kashmir Valley-IV (1998-2006); LA-39 Kashmir Valley-IV (2006-2011)

Personal details
- Party: Pakistan Muslim League (N) (2011-present)
- Other political affiliations: All Jammu and Kashmir Muslim Conference (1996-2011)

Shah Ghulam Qadir (Urdu: شاہ غلام قادر) is a Pakistani politician who has been a member of the Azad Kashmir Legislative Assembly since July 2016. He previously served as a member of the Assembly from 1998 to July 2011.

== Political career ==
Qadir was elected to the Azad Kashmir Legislative Assembly from LA-38 Kashmir Valley-IV as a candidate of All Jammu and Kashmir Muslim Conference (AJKMC) in a 1998 by-election.

He was re-elected to the Assembly from LA-38 Kashmir Valley-IV as a candidate of AJKMC in the 2001 Azad Kashmiri general election.

He was sworn into the cabinet of Prime Minister Sikandar Hayat Khan, and was made the Minister for Finance, Food, Auqaf, Zakat and Ushr. However, after a cabinet re-shuffle, he was made the Minister for Finance, Revenue and Rehabilitation. On 26 February 2004, following differences with the prime minister, he resigned from the cabinet.

He was re-elected to the Assembly from LA-39 Kashmir Valley-IV as a candidate of AJKMC in the 2006 Azad Kashmiri general election.

After the election, he was nominated by AJKMC to the position of Speaker of the Assembly. He received 35 votes and defeated Chaudhry Latif Akbar of Pakistan People's Party (PPP), who received 8 votes.

On 12 August 2010, he was ousted from the position of Speaker through a vote of no confidence that was supported by 35 members of the Assembly. He was replaced by Chaudhry Anwarul Haq of People's Muslim League.

He was re-elected to the Assembly from LA-23 Neelum as a candidate of PML(N) in the 2016 Azad Kashmiri general election. He received 40,010 votes and defeated Mian Abdul Waheed, a candidate of PPP.

After the election, he was nominated by PML(N) to the position of Speaker of the Assembly. He received 39 votes and defeated Aamir Abdul Ghaffar Lone of PPP and Malik Muhammad Nawaz Khan of AJKMC, who received four and three votes, respectively.

He was re-elected to the Assembly from LA-25 Neelum-I as a candidate of PML(N) in the 2021 Azad Kashmiri general election. He received 14,341 votes and defeated Mian Abdul Waheed, a candidate of PPP.

On 6 July 2022, he was appointed as the regional president of PML(N) in Azad Kashmir.

On 1 December 2025, he was appointed as the Leader of the Opposition in the Assembly, replacing Khawaja Farooq Ahmed of Pakistan Tehreek-e-Insaf (PTI).

He was re-elected to the Assembly from LA-25 Neelum-I as a candidate of PML(N) in the 2026 Azad Kashmiri general election. He received 19,201 votes, while the runner-up, Mian Abdul Waheed of PPP, received 13,836 votes. In the same election, he contested from LA-26 Neelum-II as a candidate of PML(N) but was unsuccessful. He received 14,501 votes and was defeated by Mian Abdul Waheed, a candidate of PPP.
