= LA-43 Kashmir Valley-IV =

Constituency of the Azad Kashmir Legislative Assembly

- Constituency for the Azad Kashmir Legislative Assembly
- District: Rawalpindi in Rawalpindi District
- Electorate: 2,457

Current constituency
- Party: Pakistan Muslim League (N)
- Member: Muhammad Yasin Lone
- Created from: LA-39 Kashmir Valley-IV

LA-43 Kashmir Valley-IV is a constituency of the Azad Kashmir Legislative Assembly which is currently represented by Muhammad Yasin Lone of Pakistan Muslim League (N) (PML(N)). It covers the area of the city of Rawalpindi. Only refugees from the Kashmir Valley settled in Pakistan are eligible to vote in this constituency.

== Election 2016 ==
General elections were held in this constituency on 21 July 2016.

General election 2016: LA-39 Kashmir Valley-IV
| Party | Candidate | Votes | % | ±% |
|---|---|---|---|---|
| PML(N) | Asad Aleem Shah | 1,026 | 41.17 | |
| PPP | Azhar Hussain Gillani | 893 | 35.83 | |
| PTI | Syed Ishtiaque | 416 | 16.69 | |
| Independent | Raja Aurungzaib | 154 | 6.18 | |
| Independent | Hasham Rasheed Butt | 3 | 0.12 | |
| Turnout | | 2,492 | | |

== Election 2021 ==
Javed Butt of the Pakistan Tehreek-e-Insaf (PTI) won this seat by getting 782 votes.

General election 2021: LA-43 Kashmir Valley-IV
| Party | Candidate | Votes | % | ±% |
|---|---|---|---|---|
| PTI | Javed Butt | 782 | 43.66 | ▲26.97 |
| PML(N) | Naseema Khatoon Wani | 720 | 40.20 | ▼0.97 |
| PPP | Hamza Majeed Bazmi | 208 | 11.61 | ▼24.22 |
| Others | Others (five candidates) | 81 | 4.52 | |
| Turnout | | 1,791 | 72.89 | |
| Majority | | 62 | 3.46 | |
| Registered electors | | 2,457 | | |
| PTI gain from PML(N) | | | | |

== Election 2026 ==
General elections were held on 2 August 2026. Muhammad Yasin Lone won the election with 1,276 votes.

General election 2026: LA-43 Kashmir Valley-IV
| Party | Candidate | Votes | % | ±% |
|---|---|---|---|---|
| PML(N) | Muhammad Yasin Lone | 1,276 | 55.99 | ▲15.79 |
| PPP | Javed Butt | 563 | 24.70 | ▲13.09 |
| IPP | Hamza Majeed Bazmi | 370 | 16.24 | |
| Others | Others (nine candidates) | 70 | 3.07 | |
| Turnout | | 2,319 | 69.22 | ▼3.67 |
| Total valid votes | | 2,279 | 98.28 | |
| Rejected ballots | | 40 | 1.72 | |
| Majority | | 713 | 31.29 | |
| Registered electors | | 3,350 | | |
| PML(N) gain from PTI | | | | |
