= Tanveer Ilyas Khan =

Prime Minister of Azad Jammu and Kashmir (2022–2023)

- تنویر الیاس خان

14th Prime Minister of Azad Kashmir
- In office 18 April 2022 – 11 April 2023
- President: Sultan Mehmood Chaudhry
- Preceded by: Abdul Qayyum Khan Niazi
- Succeeded by: Chaudhry Anwar-ul-Haq

Member of the Azad Jammu and Kashmir Legislative Assembly
- In office 3 August 2021 – 11 April 2023
- Succeeded by: Sardar Ziaul Qamar
- Constituency: LA-15 Bagh-II

President of PTI Azad Kashmir
- In office 9 September 2021 – 24 April 2023
- Chairman: Imran Khan
- Preceded by: Sultan Mehmood Chaudhry
- Succeeded by: Abdul Qayyum Khan Niazi

President of IPP Azad Kashmir
- Incumbent
- Assumed office 3 July 2026
- President: Aleem Khan
- In office 12 August 2023 – 9 March 2025
- President: Aleem Khan
- Preceded by: Position established

Personal details
- Born: Sardar Muhammad Tanveer Ilyas Khan Chughtai; 15 May 1955 (age 71) Bangoin, Azad Kashmir, Pakistan
- Citizenship: Pakistan
- Party: IPP (2023–2025; 2026–present)
- Other political affiliations: PPP (2025–2026); PTI (2021–2023)
- Profession: Businessman and Politician

Sardar Muhammad Tanveer Ilyas Khan Chughtai (Note: Urdu: سردار محمد تنویر الیاس خان چغتائی) (born 15 May 1955) is a Pakistani businessman and politician who served as Prime Minister of Azad Kashmir from 2022 to 2023. A highly influential figure in Azad Kashmir, he is the owner of Taj Residencia housing project.

Khan joined the Pakistan Tehreek-e-Insaf (PTI) around 2021 and was elected to the Azad Kashmir Legislative Assembly from LA-15 Bagh-II in the 2021 Azad Kashmiri general election. He also served as president of PTI Azad Kashmir from September 2021 to April 2023. Following the 9 May riots, he left the PTI and became a founding member of the Istehkam-e-Pakistan Party (IPP), of which he served as president of its AJK chapter from 2023 to 2025. Khan later left the IPP and joined the Pakistan People's Party (PPP), only to leave the PPP later in 2026 and rejoin the IPP. On 3 July 2026, he was re-appointed as the president of the party's AJK chapter.

== Early life ==
He was born on 15 May 1955 in the village of Bangoin near Rawalakot, Azad Kashmir, into a political family, since his late uncle Sardar Sagheer Chughtai has been elected as a Member of the Legislative Assembly from their native constituency.

== Business career ==
He is the owner of Taj Residencia housing project.

== Political career ==
He has served as advisor on investment to the Chief Minister of Punjab.

He was elected to the Azad Jammu and Kashmir Legislative Assembly from LA-15 Bagh-II as a candidate of the Pakistan Tehreek-e-Insaf (PTI) in the 2021 Azad Kashmiri general election. He received 19,825 votes and defeated Ziaul Qamar, a candidate of the Pakistan People's Party (PPP).

On 18 April 2022, Ilyas was elected as the 14th Prime Minister of Azad Jammu and Kashmir, succeeding Abdul Qayyum Khan Niazi, who resigned after the PTI initiated a vote of no confidence against the latter.

Khan served as president of the PTI in Azad Kashmir. On 11 April 2023, Ilyas was disqualified from being a member of the legislative assembly when he was found guilty of contempt of court by the High Court of Azad Jammu and Kashmir. Thus, he ceased to hold the office of the AJK prime minister.

He was one of the founding members of the Istehkam-e-Pakistan Party (IPP) when it was launched on 8 June 2023, and was appointed as the president of its AJK chapter on 13 August 2023. He quit the IPP on 9 March 2025.

He joined the PPP on 24 June 2025. In July 2026, Khan left the PPP over differences on the distribution of party tickets and rejoined the IPP. Tanveer was later named the president of IPP in Azad Kashmir.

He contested the 2026 Azad Kashmiri general election from LA-15 Bagh-II and LA-25 Neelum-I as a candidate of IPP, but was unsuccessful. From LA-15 Bagh-II, he received 1,220 votes, placing fourth, and was defeated by Ziaul Qamar of PPP. From LA-25 Neelum-I, he received 3,348 votes, placing third, and was defeated by Shah Ghulam Qadir of Pakistan Muslim League (N) (PML(N)).

He was also to contest from LA-22 Poonch & Sudhnoti-V as a candidate of IPP, but elections in the constituency were postponed.
