= Chaudhry Anwarul Haq =

Former Prime Minister of AJK

- چودهرى انوار الحق

15th Prime Minister of Azad Kashmir
- In office 20 April 2023 – 17 November 2025
- President: Sultan Mehmood Chaudhry
- Preceded by: Sardar Tanveer Ilyas
- Succeeded by: Faisal Mumtaz Rathore

Member of the Azad Jammu and Kashmir Legislative Assembly
- In office 3 August 2021 – 25 August 2026
- Preceded by: Chaudhry Tariq Farooq
- Succeeded by: Chaudhry Tariq Farooq
- Constituency: LA-7 Bhimber-III
- In office 24 July 2006 – 25 July 2011
- Preceded by: Chaudhry Tariq Farooq
- Succeeded by: Chaudhry Tariq Farooq
- Constituency: LA-7 Bhimber-III

Speaker of the Azad Jammu and Kashmir Legislative Assembly
- In office 3 August 2021 – 20 April 2023
- Deputy: Riaz Gujjar
- Preceded by: Shah Ghulam Qadir
- Succeeded by: Chaudhry Latif Akbar
- In office 16 August 2010 – 25 July 2011
- Deputy: Meher-un-Nisa
- Preceded by: Shah Ghulam Qadir
- Succeeded by: Sardar Ghulam Sadiq Khan

Personal details
- Born: 1970 (age 55–56) Bhimber, Azad Kashmir, Pakistan
- Citizenship: Pakistan
- Party: Independent (2016–2020; 2026–present)
- Other political affiliations: PTI (2018–2023 ) PPP (2011–2016); People's Muslim League (2006–2011)
- Profession: Politician

Chaudhry Anwar ul Haq (Urdu: چودهرى انوار الحق) is a Pakistani politician from Azad Jammu and Kashmir (AJK). He served as the 15th Prime Minister of AJK between April 2023 and November 2025, succeeding Sardar Tanveer Ilyas.

He was a member of the Pakistan Tehreek-e-Insaaf (PTI) until September 7, 2023, when he was expelled from the party along with a group of political defectors.

== Early life and family ==
Anwar was born in Bhimber, Azad Kashmir, into a politically active family of the Jat community, as his father Chaudhry Suhbat Ali was part of the 1947 Poonch rebellion which liberated current Azad Kashmir from the Dogras, while his brother Lt General (r) Chaudhary Ikram ul Haq is a former Defence Secretary (2018-2020).

== Political career ==
Anwar was elected to the Azad Jammu and Kashmir Legislative Assembly in the 2006 Azad Kashmiri general election from LA-7 Bhimber-III as a candidate of the People's Muslim League. He defeated Chaudhry Tariq Farooq.

On 16 August 2010, he was elected as the Speaker of the Azad Jammu and Kashmir Legislative Assembly. He succeeded Shah Ghulam Qadir of the All Jammu and Kashmir Muslim Conference (AJKMC).

He contested the 2011 Azad Kashmiri general election from LA-7 Bhimber-III as a candidate of the Pakistan People's Party (PPP), but was unsuccessful. He received 26,509 votes and was defeated by Chaudhry Tariq Farooq, a candidate of the Pakistan Muslim League (N) (PML(N)).

He contested the 2016 Azad Kashmiri general election from LA-7 Bhimber-III as an independent candidate, but was defeated by Chaudhry Tariq Farooq, a candidate of the PML(N). Anwar received 27,676 votes while Farooq received 30,339 votes.

He was re-elected to the Azad Jammu and Kashmir Legislative Assembly in the 2021 general election from LA-7 Bhimber-III as a candidate of the Pakistan Tehreek-e-Insaf (PTI). He received 38,308 votes and defeated Chaudhry Tariq Farooq, a candidate of the (PML(N)).

On 3 August 2021, he was elected as the Speaker of the Azad Jammu and Kashmir Legislative Assembly with 32 votes, defeating Faisal Mumtaz Rathore of the PPP. He succeeded the outgoing Speaker Shah Ghulam Qadir of the PML(N).

On 20 April 2023, he was elected unopposed as the 15th Prime Minister of Azad Kashmir with 48 votes in the 52-member AJK Legislative Assembly. He succeeded the previous Prime Minister, Sardar Tanveer Ilyas, who had been disqualified eight days prior.

On 7 September 2023, Dawn reported that the Kashmir chapter of the PTI had expelled Anwar in a crackdown against dissidents who had sided against Imran Khan's preferred candidate Sardar Abdul Qayyum Niazi.

On 17 November 2025, a no-confidence motion against Anwarul Haq was passed when 36 members in the AJK Legislative Assembly voted in favour of it and two against it.

He contested the 2026 Azad Kashmiri general election from LA-7 Bhimber-III as an independent candidate, but was unsuccessful. He received 25,534 votes and was defeated by Chaudhry Tariq Farooq, a candidate of PML(N).
