= List of members of the 12th Legislative Assembly of Azad Kashmir =

The 12th Legislative Assembly of Azad Kashmir was formed following the 2026 Azad Kashmiri general election, which was held in phases in July and August 2026. The Azad Kashmir Legislative Assembly has a constitutional strength of 53 members, comprising 45 directly elected members, who then elected eight members to reserved seats.

Polling in seven constituencies was postponed, leaving the Assembly with 46 members at the time of its first sitting.

The Pakistan Muslim League (Nawaz) (PML-N) formed the government after securing a majority in the Assembly, while the Pakistan Peoples Party (PPP) became the principal opposition party. At the time of the election of the prime minister, the Assembly's standing strength consisted of 32 members belonging to the PML-N and its ally and 14 members belonging to the PPP.

Barrister Syed Iftikhar Ali Gillani was elected Prime Minister of Azad Kashmir on 28 August 2026, receiving 30 votes against 14 votes received by PPP candidate Sardar Mukhtar Ahmed Abbasi.

== Members ==
| Constituency | | Member | Party | Notes |
| District | Name | Member | Party | Notes |
|---|---|---|---|---|
| Mirpur | LA-1 | Chaudhry Azhar Sadiq | PML(N) | |
| Mirpur | LA-2 | Chaudhry Qasim Majeed | PPP | |
| Mirpur | LA-3 | Chaudhry Yasir Sultan | PPP | |
| Mirpur | LA-4 | Chaudhry Rukhsar Ahmed | PML(N) | |
| Bhimber | LA-5 | Waqar Ahmed Noor | PML(N) | |
| Bhimber | LA-6 | Chaudhry Muhammad Razzaq | PML(N) | |
| Bhimber | LA-7 | Chaudhry Tariq Farooq | PML(N) | Speaker |
| Kotli | LA-8 | Zafar Iqbal Malik | PPP | |
| Kotli | LA-9 | Umair Naeem | PML(N) | |
| Kotli | LA-10 | Chaudhry Muhammad Yasin | PPP | Leader of the Opposition |
| Kotli | LA-11 | Raja Muhammad Asif Khan | PML(N) | |
| Kotli | LA-12 | Raja Muhammad Riasat Khan | PML(N) | |
| Kotli | LA-13 | Raja Ayaz Ahmed Khan | PML(N) | |
| Bagh | LA-14 | Sajid Iqbal Abbasi | JKADB | |
| Bagh | LA-15 | Ziaul Qamar | PPP | |
| Bagh | LA-16 | Mir Akbar Khan | PML(N) | |
| Bagh | LA-17 | Faisal Mumtaz Rathore | PPP | |
| Poonch | LA-18 | Vacant | | |
| Poonch | LA-19 | Vacant | | |
| Poonch | LA-20 | Vacant | | |
| Poonch | LA-21 | Vacant | | |
| Poonch | LA-22 | Vacant | | |
| Sudhnoti | LA-23 | Vacant | | |
| Sudhnoti | LA-24 | Vacant | | |
| Neelum | LA-25 | Shah Ghulam Qadir | PML(N) | |
| Neelum | LA-26 | Mian Abdul Waheed | PPP | |
| Muzaffarabad | LA-27 | Noreen Arif | PML(N) | |
| Muzaffarabad | LA-28 | Syed Bazil Ali Naqvi | PPP | |
| Muzaffarabad | LA-29 | Mukhtar Ahmad Khan Abbasi | PPP | |
| Muzaffarabad | LA-30 | Mustafa Bashir Abbasi | PML(N) | |
| Muzaffarabad | LA-31 | Saqib Majeed Raja | PML(N) | |
| Muzaffarabad | LA-32 | Raja Farooq Haider Khan | PML(N) | |
| Muzaffarabad | LA-33 | Dewan Ali Khan Chughtai | PPP | |
| Jammu & Others | LA-34 | Nasir Hussain Dar | PML(N) | |
| Jammu & Others | LA-35 | Chaudhry Muhammad Ismail Gujjar | PML(N) | |
| Jammu & Others | LA-36 | Muhammad Ahsan Raza | PML(N) | |
| Jammu & Others | LA-37 | Maryam Javed | PML(N) | |
| Jammu & Others | LA-38 | Choudhary Zeeshan Younas Tanda | PML(N) | |
| Jammu & Others | LA-39 | Raja Muhammad Siddique Khan | PML(N) | |
| Kashmir Valley | LA-40 | Amir Abdul Ghaffar Lone | PPP | |
| Kashmir Valley | LA-41 | Syed Muhammad Amir Shah | PML(N) | |
| Kashmir Valley | LA-42 | Syed Shaukat Ali Shah | PML(N) | |
| Kashmir Valley | LA-43 | Muhammad Yasin Lone | PML(N) | |
| Kashmir Valley | LA-44 | Muhammad Ahmed Raza Qadri | PML(N) | Deputy Speaker |
| Kashmir Valley | LA-45 | Abdul Majid Khan | PPP | |
| Reserved seats for women | | Sehrish Qamar Malik | PML(N) | |
| Reserved seats for women | | Maryam Idrees | PML(N) | |
| Reserved seats for women | | Maryam Zaman | PML(N) | |
| Reserved seats for women | | Farzana Yaqoob | PPP | |
| Reserved seats for women | | Zobia Khurshid Raja | PPP | |
| Reserved seats for technocrats | | Iftikhar Gilani | PML(N) | Prime Minister |
| Reserved seats for Ulema | | Mazhar Saeed Shah | PML(N) | |
| Reserved seats for overseas Kashmiris | | Chaudhry Abdul Rehman Arain | PML(N) | |
