= 2026 Azad Kashmiri general election =

Pakistani regional election

2026 Azad Kashmir general election
- 27 July 2026 (Phase I); 2 August 2026 (Note: Polling for LA-27 Muzaffarabad-I and 51 polling stations of LA-28 Muzaffarabad-II were held on 4 August 2026.) (Phase II); 10 August 2026 (Note: Re-polling for 9 polling staitions in LA-15 Bagh-II and 14 polling stations in LA-16 Bagh-III was held on 15 August 2026.) (Note: Elections for 7 seats were postponed in Poonch and Sudhanoti districts.) (Phase III)

46 of 53 seats in the Azad Kashmir Legislative Assembly 27 seats needed for a majority
- Registered: 3,804,368
- Turnout: 48.24% (Note: The turnout figure ignores the number of registered electors for the constituencies that saw their election postponed.) (▼13.06pp)
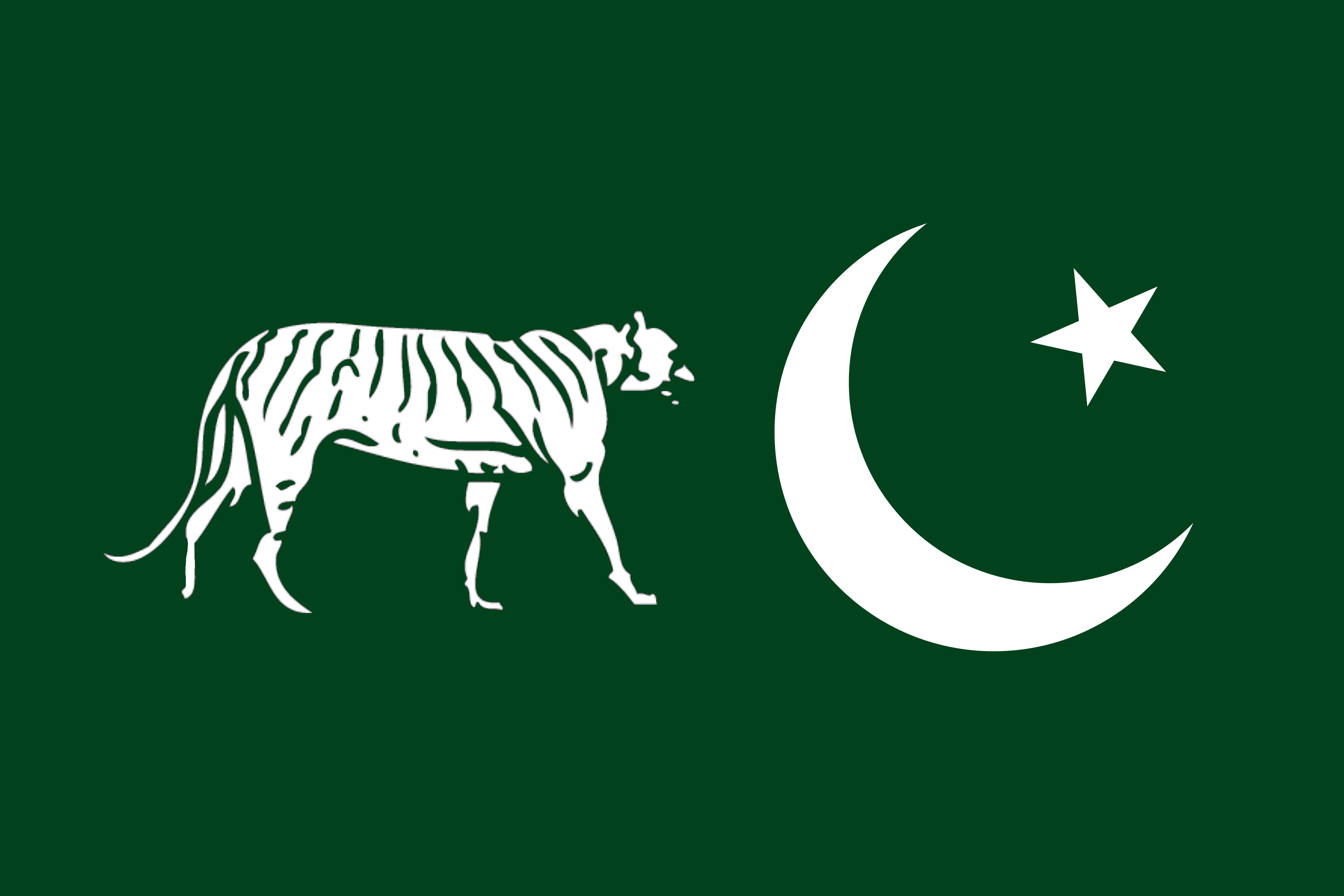

	First party	Second party
Leader	Shah Ghulam Qadir (Note: Shah Ghulam Qadir was the President of PML(N)'s Azad Kashmir chapter at the time of the election, and he was announced as the party's nominee for the position of Prime Minister. However, on 27 August, the party changed its decision and instead nominated Iftikhar Gilani.)	Faisal Mumtaz Rathore
Party	PML(N)	PPP
Leader's seat	Neelum-I; Neelum-II (lost)	Bagh-IV
Last election	7 seats, 25.1%	12 seats, 17.9%
Seats before	8	29
Seats won	31	14
Seat change	▲23	▼15
Popular vote	655,274	466,791
Percentage	44.5%	31.7%
Swing	▲19.4pp	▲13.8pp
- Map of Azad Kashmir showing Assembly Constituencies
Prime Minister before election
Faisal Mumtaz Rathore
PPP
Elected Prime Minister
Iftikhar Gilani
PML(N)

General elections were held in Azad Kashmir starting from 27 July 2026 to 10 August 2026. The elections were held in 33 constituencies of Azad Kashmir and 12 constituencies of the refugees of Jammu and Kashmir in Pakistan.

The election campaign took place amid heightened political tensions and civil unrest in parts of the Azad Kashmir. In June 2026, clashes between Pakistan Army and protesters led by the Joint Awami Action Committee (JAAC), demanding the abolition of refugee seats, resulted in many deaths and multiple injuries. Authorities imposed restrictions on public gatherings and arrested several activists, while opposition groups and human rights advocates criticized the government's response to the protests. The unrest prompted concerns regarding the political environment ahead of the elections due to the participation of various political and civil society groups. Citing the unrest, Pakistan Tehreek-e-Insaf (PTI), the winning party of the previous election, announced that it would boycott these elections.

== Background ==
Following the 2021 elections, the Pakistan Tehreek-e-Insaf (PTI) won 32 seats, the Pakistan People's Party (PPP) won 12 seats, and the Pakistan Muslim League (N) won 7 seats. The All Jammu and Kashmir Muslim Conference (AJKMC) and Jammu Kashmir Peoples Party (JKPP) also bagged a seat each.

The PTI comfortably formed a majority government with 32 out of 53 seats, electing Abdul Qayyum Khan Niazi as the region's Prime Minister. The party also clinched the offices of Speaker, Deputy Speaker, and President, electing Chaudhry Anwarul Haq, Riaz Gujar, and Sultan Mehmood Chaudhry, respectively. Less than a year later, on 14 April 2022, following a resolution of a vote of no-confidence by 25 members from his own party, Niazi resigned his office. The movers of the resolution accused him of "loss of the trust of the parliamentary party, failure to highlight Kashmir issue and implement party manifesto in addition to bad or good governance, nepotism and violation of merit".

He was replaced by Tanveer Ilyas Khan, the president of PTI's regional chapter, who was elected on 18 April 2022. However, on 11 April 2023, similar to his predecessor, Khan ceased to be Prime Minister less than a year later when he was disqualified by the High Court of Azad Jammu and Kashmir after being found guilty of contempt of court. He also ceased to be a member of the assembly, rendering his seat vacant.

Khan was replaced by Haq, the Speaker of the Assembly, who was elected unopposed to the Prime Minister's office on 20 April 2023. Haq created his own forward bloc of the PTI consisting of 12 members, and subsequently formed a coalition government with the PPP and PML(N).

Following defections from the PTI's forward bloc, the PPP and PML(N) increased their number of seats to 29 and 9, respectively. The PTI now only had 13 members, with eight of them being part of the forward bloc. On 17 November 2025, Haq was ousted through a motion of no confidence that was supported by the 36 members of the Assembly affiliated with the PPP and PML(N).

On the same day, he was replaced by Faisal Mumtaz Rathore, who was elected to the Assembly as a member of the PPP. The PPP formed a majority government in the region for the first time since 2016. The PML(N) and the PTI, including members of the forward bloc, remained on the opposition benches.

On 5 June 2026, the Azad Jammu and Kashmir Election Commission (AJKEC) announced the schedule for the election, setting 27 July 2026 as the polling date. Candidates filed nomination papers from 9 to 19 June, scrutiny was carried out from 20 June, and candidates filed appeals on rejections and acceptances of nomination papers from 21 to 24 June. Appeals were heard on 26 and 27 June, and decisions were made from 28 to 29 June. Candidates were allowed to withdraw their candidacies until 30 June. The list of contesting candidates were published on 1 July, and electoral symbols were allotted on 2 July.

On 2 July 2026, Pakistan Tehreek-e-Insaf (PTI) announced that it would boycott the election, citing the political and social unrest in the region.

On 21 July 2026, the AJKEC announced a revision of the election's schedule, where polling would now take place in three phases. Polling will be held in Mirpur Division on 27 July, in Muzaffarabad Division and 12 refugee seats in the rest of Pakistan on 2 August, and in Poonch Division on 10 August. In a press conference, Ghulam Mustafa Mughal, the Chief Election Commissioner, cited the need to ensure the availability of army personnel to provide security during the polling process. He further stated that this new stage-wise polling process was decided after consulting with participating political parties.

On 7 August 2026, elections in the districts of Poonch and Sudhnoti, which were to be held on 10 August along with Bagh District, were postponed due to security concerns over the law-and-order situation in both districts.

== Parties ==
The table below lists all parties that won seats in the 2021 elections, except for Pakistan Tehreek-e-Insaf (PTI), which has boycotted the 2026 elections.

Name		National Leader	Claimed Ideology(ies)	Total seats at start of the 12th Legislative Assembly	Total seats at the end of the 12th Legislative Assembly	Symbol
PML(N)	Pakistan Muslim League (Nawaz) پاکستان مسلم لیگ (نواز)	Nawaz Sharif	Conservatism; Economic liberalism Federalism	7 / 53	8 / 53	Tiger
PPP	Pakistan Peoples Party پاکستان پیپلز پارٹی	Bilawal Bhutto Zardari	Social Democracy; Secularism; Social liberalism	12 / 53	29 / 53	Arrow
AJKMC	All Jammu and Kashmir Muslim Conference آل جموں و کشمیر مسلم کانفرنس	Attique Ahmed Khan	Pakistani nationalism Islamic democracy Kashmiriyat	1 / 53	1 / 53	Horse
JKPP	Jammu Kashmir Peoples Party جموں و کشمیر پیپلز پارٹی	Hassan Ibrahim Khan	Kashmiri nationalism Islamic democracy Regionalism	1 / 53	1 / 53	Sword

== Results ==
The tables below show the results of the elections. The first table shows the results for the elections across all 24 constituencies, and shows each political party's standing after independents joining different parties and the allotment of reserved seats. The latter three tables show more detailed results for each of the 45 constituencies, separated by polling dates.

Party	Votes	%	Seats					
Party	Votes	%	Contested	Won (General)	Reserved (Women)	Reserved (Technocrats, Ulema, Overseas)	Total	+/-
PML(N)	655,274	44.46	44	25	3	3	31	▲23
PPP	466,791	31.67	43	12	2	0	14	▼15
IPP	98,997	6.72		0	0	0	0	Steady
JKADB	40,582	2.75		1	0	0	1	▲1
JI	36,321	2.46		0	0	0	0	Steady
AJKMC	33,245	2.26	36	0	0	0	0	▼1
Jammu Kashmir United Movement	24,418	1.66		0	0	0	0	Steady
PML(Q)	10,697	0.73		0	0	0	0	Steady
JKPP	1,450	0.10	9	0	0	0	0	Steady
Pakistan Nazriyati Party	1,024	0.07		0	0	0	0	Steady
Jammu Kashmir National Liberation Movement	878	0.06		0	0	0	0	Steady
Tehreek Jawanan Pakistan	777	0.05		0	0	0	0	Steady
Gujjar Qaumi Party	158	0.01		0	0	0	0	Steady
PPP(SB)	130	0.01		0	0	0	0	Steady
MQM-P	106	0.01		0	0	0	0	Steady
Qaumi Ittehad Party	95	0.01		0	0	0	0	Steady
Jammu Kashmir Liberation League	82	0.01		0	0	0	0	Steady
Jammu Kashmir Democratic Party	60	0.004		0	0	0	0	Steady
MJAH	42	0.003		0	0	0	0	Steady
Jamaat Falah Insaniat	7	0.0005		0	0	0	0	Steady
JUI-F	2	0.0001		0	0	0	0	Steady
IND	102,844	6.98		0	0	0	0	Steady
Valid ballots/Total seats	1,473,980	98.20		38	5	3	46	
Rejected ballots	26,980	1.80						
Cast ballots	1,500,960							
Registered voters/turnout	3,111,162	48.24						

=== By constituency ===
==== Phase I (Mirpur Division) ====
Constituency		Winner				Runner-up				Margin	Registered Voters	Votes Cast	Voter Turnout	Source(s)
District	Name	Candidate	Party	Votes	%	Candidate	Party	Votes	%	Margin	Registered Voters	Votes Cast	Voter Turnout	Source(s)
Mirpur	LA-1	Chaudhry Azhar Sadiq	PML(N)	15,427	57.44	Muhammad Afsar Shahid	PPP	9,832	37.61	5,595	105,174	28,204	26.82	
Mirpur	LA-2	Chaudhry Qasim Majeed	PPP	13,376	45.82	Azeem Bakhsh Chaudhry	PML(N)	8,499	29.11	4,877	99,585	30,709	30.84	
Mirpur	LA-3	Chaudhry Yasir Sultan	PPP	12,590	41.35	Chaudhry Muhammad Saeed	PML(N)	11,081	36.40	1,509	106,755	32,010	29.98	
Mirpur	LA-4	Chaudhry Rukhsar Ahmed	PML(N)	22,376	52.08	Sohaib Arshad	PPP	15,851	36.89	6,525	99,624	45,192	45.36	
Bhimber	LA-5	Waqar Ahmed Noor	PML(N)	29,821	48.35	Chaudhry Pervaiz Ashraf	PPP	29,100	47.12	721	103,956	62,546	60.17	
Bhimber	LA-6	Chaudhry Muhammad Razzaq	PML(N)	32,732	53.80	Chaudhry Ali Shan	IPP	26,718	43.92	6,014	108,976	61,971	56.87	
Bhimber	LA-7	Chaudhry Tariq Farooq	PML(N)	37,613	51.16	Chaudhry Anwarul Haq	IND	25,534	34.73	12,079	129,994	75,414	58.01	
Kotli	LA-8	Zafar Iqbal Malik	PPP	19,994	52.39	Malik Muhammad Nawaz Khan	PML(N)	12,233	32.05	7,761	90,327	38,793	42.95	
Kotli	LA-9	Umair Naeem	PML(N)	31,680	51.61	Chaudhry Javed Iqbal Budhanvi	PPP	29,098	47.40	2,582	103,211	61,425	59.51	
Kotli	LA-10	Chaudhry Muhammad Yasin	PPP	12,431	44.02	Fateh Mahmood-ul-Hassan	PML(N)	9,246	32.74	3,185	87,145	29,103	33.40	
Kotli	LA-11	Raja Muhammad Asif Khan	PML(N)	26,758	49.40	Chaudhry Muhammad Akhlaq	PPP	22,174	40.94	4,584	124,664	54,269	43.53	
Kotli	LA-12	Raja Muhammad Riasat Khan	PML(N)	35,168	51.84	Chaudhry Muhammad Yasin	PPP	30,320	44.69	4,848	126,332	67,838	53.70	
Kotli	LA-13	Raja Ayaz Ahmed Khan	PML(N)	21,284	39.73	Nisar Ansar	IPP	15,892	29.67	5,392	115,694	54,665	47.25	

==== Phase II (Muzaffarabad Division & Refugee Seats ====
Constituency		Winner				Runner-up				Margin	Registered Voters	Votes Cast	Voter Turnout	Source(s)
District	Name	Candidate	Party	Votes	%	Candidate	Party	Votes	%	Margin	Registered Voters	Votes Cast	Voter Turnout	Source(s)
Neelum	LA-25	Shah Ghulam Qadir	PML(N)	19,201	46.33	Mian Abdul Waheed	PPP	13,836	33.38	5,365	80,239	42,312	52.73	
Neelum	LA-26	Mian Abdul Waheed	PPP	16,524	41.51	Shah Ghulam Qadir	PML(N)	14,501	36.42	2,023	71,672	40,479	56.48	
Muzaffarabad	LA-27	Noreen Arif	PML(N)	18,919	32.12	Sardar Tabarak Ali	IPP	18,621	31.61	298	107,061	59,878	55.93	
Muzaffarabad	LA-28	Syed Bazil Ali Naqvi	PPP	27,731	47.72	Chaudhry Shahzad Mahmood	PML(N)	26,518	45.63	1,213	99,973	59,228	59.24	
Muzaffarabad	LA-29	Mukhtar Ahmad Khan Abbasi	PPP	19,792		Iftikhar Gilani	PML(N)	16,413						
Muzaffarabad	LA-30	Mustafa Bashir Abbasi	PML(N)	17,895	45.54	Mubashir Munir Awan	PPP	12,323	31.36	5,572	68,228	40,229	58.96	
Muzaffarabad	LA-31	Saqib Majeed Raja	PML(N)	32,511	54.24	Chaudhry Latif Akbar	PPP	23,957	39.97	8,554	128,177	61,470	47.96	
Muzaffarabad	LA-32	Raja Farooq Haider Khan	PML(N)	21,613	45.46	Muhammad Ashfaq Zaffar	PPP	19,274	40.54	2,339	90,710	48,499	53.47	
Muzaffarabad	LA-33	Dewan Ali Khan Chughtai	PPP	25,882	50.63	Muhammad Rasheed	PML(N)	21,481	42.02	4,401	86,790	51,117	58.90	
Jammu & Others	LA-34	Nasir Hussain Dar	PML(N)	5,682	53.44	Riaz Ahmed Gujjar	IND	2,124	19.98	3,558	19,008	10,826	56.95	
Jammu & Others	LA-35	Chaudhry Muhammad Ismail Gujjar	PML(N)	24,318	67.35	Sardar Muhammad Ghias	IND	5,965	16.52	18,353	87,274	36,649	41.99	
Jammu & Others	LA-36	Muhammad Ahsan Raza	PML(N)	27,218	64.32	Ahsan Ismail	PPP	12,990	30.70	14,228	100,073	43,101	43.07	
Jammu & Others	LA-37	Maryam Javed	PML(N)	28,547	51.27	Usman Aleem	Jammu Kashmir United Movement	22,937	41.19	5,610	111,203	56,408	50.73	
Jammu & Others	LA-38	Choudhary Zeeshan Younas Tanda	PML(N)	13,652	52.11	Chaudhry Mohammad Akbar Ibrahim	PML(Q)	9,523	36.35	4,129	50,225	26,647	53.05	
Jammu & Others	LA-39	Raja Muhammad Siddique Khan	PML(N)	10,981	58.93	Chaudhry Fakhar Zaman	PPP	5,081	27.27	5,900	37,639	19,052	50.62	
Kashmir Valley	LA-40	Amir Abdul Ghaffar Lone	PPP	2,914	89.61	Muhammad Saleem Butt	IPP	136	4.18	2,778	5,777	3,279	56.76	
Kashmir Valley	LA-41	Syed Muhammad Amir Shah	PML(N)	1,804	45.01	Saba Dewan	IND	1,523	38.00	281	6,410	4,082	63.68	
Kashmir Valley	LA-42	Syed Shaukat Ali Shah	PML(N)	1,524	63.32	Muhammad Asim Sharif	PPP	477	19.82	1,047	4,167	2,451	58.82	
Kashmir Valley	LA-43	Muhammad Yasin Lone	PML(N)	1,276	55.99	Javed Butt	PPP	563	24.70	713	3,350	2,319	69.22	
Kashmir Valley	LA-44	Muhammad Ahmed Raza Qadri	PML(N)	2,308	57.47	Meher-un-Nisa	AJKMC	740	18.43	1,568	6,952	4,064	58.46	
Kashmir Valley	LA-45	Abdul Majid Khan	PPP	3,448	74.55	Khawaja Muhammad Dilawar	AJKMC	823	17.79	2,625	7,655	4,675	61.07	

==== Phase III (Poonch Division) ====
Constituency		Winner				Runner-up				Margin	Registered Voters	Votes Cast	Voter Turnout	Source(s)
District	Name	Candidate	Party	Votes	%	Candidate	Party	Votes	%	Margin	Registered Voters	Votes Cast	Voter Turnout	Source(s)
Bagh	LA-14	Sajid Iqbal Abbasi	JKADB	40,522	60.41	Attique Ahmed Khan	AJKMC	19,637	29.28	20,885	121,199	68,094	56.18	
Bagh	LA-15	Ziaul Qamar	PPP	17,018	36.90	Mushtaq Ahmed Minhas	PML(N)	15,127	32.80	1,891	114,937	46,799	40.72	
Bagh	LA-16	Mir Akbar Khan	PML(N)	20,793	50.81	Qamr uz Zaman Khan	PPP	16,964	41.45	3,829	106,721	42,017	39.37	
Bagh	LA-17	Faisal Mumtaz Rathore	PPP	33,872	39.99	Chaudhry Mohsin Aziz	PML(N)	32,354	38.20	1,518	117,514	85,166	72.47	
Poonch	LA-18	Elections postponed.												
Poonch	LA-19	Elections postponed.												
Poonch	LA-20	Elections postponed.												
Poonch	LA-21	Elections postponed.												
Poonch	LA-22	Elections postponed.												
Sudhnoti	LA-23	Elections postponed.												
Sudhnoti	LA-24	Elections postponed.												

==== Reserved seats ====
Reserved seat	Winner		Source(s)
Reserved seat	Candidate	Party	Source(s)
Women	Sehrish Qamar Malik	PML(N)	
Women	Maryam Idrees	PML(N)	
Women	Maryam Zaman	PML(N)	
Women	Farzana Yaqoob	PPP	
Women	Zobia Khurshid Raja	PPP	
Technocrats	Iftikhar Gilani	PML(N)	
Ulema	Mazhar Saeed Shah	PML(N)	
Overseas	Chaudhry Abdul Rehman Arain	PML(N)	

== Irregularities and allegations ==
During the first phase of elections, PPP and the Sindh Local Governments Minister Saeed Ghani accused the PML-N of being behind the killing of a PPP worker in Kotli, Mukhtar Younus who was shot during polling in Nikyal. Ghani stated that the firing came from the PML-N candidate's side. He also criticised the election commission's handling of polls. The Punjab Information Minister Azma Bukhari claimed that PML-N workers had discovered bags containing "ballot papers" at the residence of a PPP candidate. She also claimed that some individuals fled with bags with "bogus votes" to help PPP win.

On 3 August, Sindh minister Sharjeel Inam Memon accused the federal government, the region's Election Commission and the PML-N of colluding to influence the Legislative Assembly elections, alleging widespread irregularities and voter manipulation. He alleged that the Election Commission ignored PPP's complaints. Memon also questioned the commission's decision to postpone polling in LA-27, saying weather had been cited as the reason despite "clear conditions."

For the third phase, polling in all six constituencies of Rawalakot and Sudhnoti districts was postponed due to the "deteriorating law and order situation" and "security concerns."

PPP leaders made various allegations. The party's regional president, Chaudhry Yasin alleged that Punjab police had been deliberately called to the region for "specific purposes" while claiming that the incumbent chief election commissioner had "specific objectives." He also alleged that the elections in LA-9 were subject to "outright rigging." Shahlah Raza too made claims of rigging. According to her, between 26 and 29 July, complaints had been submitted to the Election Commission before 1:00PM on polling day and that "election material" was snatched from police personnel. Senator Palwasha Khan described the elections as "the darkest blot" on the electoral process while claiming that the PML-N had prior knowledge of the election results before its victory was announced. She also questioned credibility of elections over concentration of exceptionally "high voter turnout" in certain areas.

== Voter turnout ==
The first phase of the election had a voter turnout of 46 percent.

During the second phase, the election officials claimed a turnout of nearly 50 percent amid JKJAAC's boycott call. However, the turnout was less than the 60 percent and above figure recorded in the 2021 and 2016 elections.

== Aftermath ==
Following the election, since PML(N) won a majority of seats, it was able to easily elect its candidates for the constitutional positions in the Assembly. On 25 August, Chaudhry Tariq Farooq and Muhammad Ahmed Raza Qadri were elected as Speaker and Deputy Speaker, respectively, receiving 32 votes. They defeated Chaudhry Qasim Majeed and Amir Abdul Ghaffar Lone of PPP, who received 13 votes. Since the position of President was vacant, Farooq also automatically became the acting president. For the position of Prime Minister, PML(N) nominated Shah Ghulam Qadir, its regional president, who served as the Leader of the Opposition in the previous tenure of the Assembly. However, on 27 August, the party changed course and nominated Iftikhar Gilani as its candidate. On 28 August, Gilani was elected as Prime Minister, receiving 30 votes and defeating Mukhtar Ahmad Khan Abbasi of PPP. On the same day, Chaudhry Muhammad Yasin of PPP was appointed as the Leader of the Opposition.

== See also ==
- 2026 Gilgit Baltistan Assembly election
