= Constituency LA-37 Jammu - 4 (Narowal) =

Constituency of Azad Kashmir Legislative Assembly

Constituency LA-XXXVII JAMMU - IV (Jammu and Others-IV)
- State Assembly constituency for the Azad Kashmir Legislative Assembly
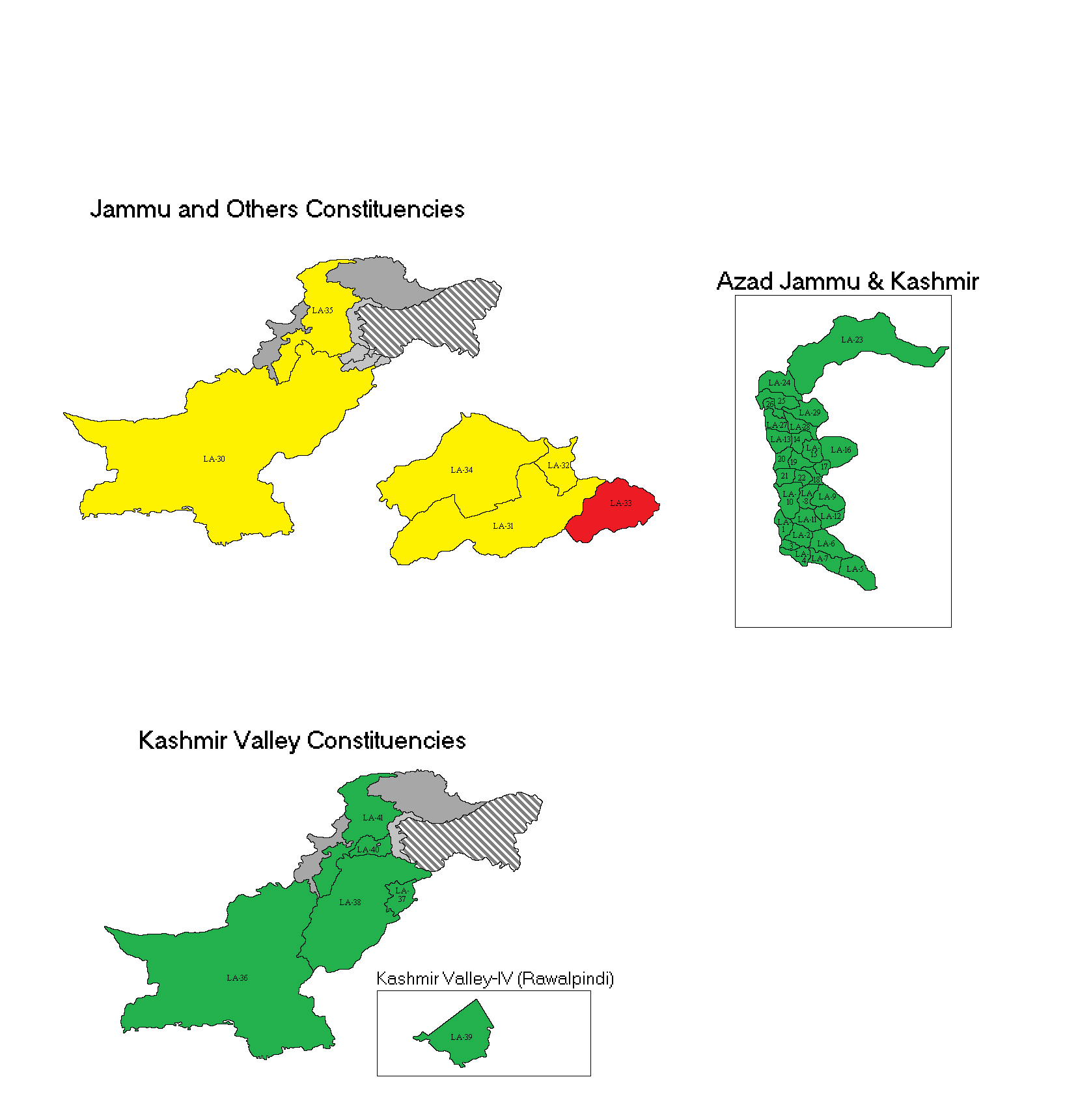
- District: Narowal District
- Province: Azad Kashmir
- Electorate: 95,694

Current constituency
- Member: Muhammad Akmal Sargala (Pakistan Tehreek-e-Insaf)
- Created from: Constituency LA-33

LA-37 Jammu - 4 (Narowal) is a constituency of Azad Kashmir Legislative Assembly which is currently represented by Muhammad Akmal Sargala of Pakistan Tehreek-e-Insaf. It covers the area of Narowal District in Pakistan. Only refugees from Jammu and Ladakh settled in Pakistan are eligible to vote.

== Election 2021 ==
General elections were held on 25 July 2021. Muhammad Akmal Sargala of PTI won with 26,039 votes and became a member of Azad Kashmir Legislative Assembly.

2021 Azad Kashmiri general election: LA-37 (Jammu and Others-IV)
Party	Candidate	Votes	%	±%
PTI	Muhammad Akmal Sargala	26,039		
PML(N)	Muhammad Siddique Chaudary	25,726		
TLP	Arsrlan Rasheed	4378		
Muslim Conference	Muhammad Rabiah Ghias	2,247		
JKUM	Usman Aleem	1,407		
Independent	Zeeshan Raza	1,049		
Independent	Muhammad Saad Raza	387		
Independent	Rana Munawar Alam	352		
PPP	Mazhar Yousaf Chaudary	101		
Independent	Muhammad Usman	93		
Independent	Muhammad Siddique	54		
Independent	Muhammad Adil Siddique	0		
Turnout		62,520		

== Election 2016 ==
General elections were held on 21 July 2016. Mian Muhammad Rasheed of PML-N won with 26,440 votes and became a member of Kashmir Legislative Assembly.

Azad Kashmir Election 2016: LA-33 (Jammu and Others-III)
Party	Candidate	Votes	%	±%
PML(N)	Mian Muhammad Yasir Rasheed	26,440		
PTI	Muhammad Akmal Sargala	19,781		
Muslim Conference	Muhammad Faiz Chaudhary	1,825		
PPP	Syed Ishtiaq ul Hassan Gillani	234		
Independent	Bashir Ahmad Qadri	151		
Independent	Muhammad Zahid	63		
Turnout		48,494		
