= Zafar Iqbal Malik =

Pakistani politician

- ظفر اقبال ملک

Member of the Azad Kashmir Legislative Assembly
- Incumbent
- Assumed office 3 August 2021
- Preceded by: Malik Muhammad Nawaz Khan
- Constituency: LA-8 Kotli-I

Personal details
- Party: Pakistan People's Party (2025-present)
- Other political affiliations: Pakistan Tehreek-e-Insaf (2021-2025)

Zafar Iqbal Malik (Urdu: ظفر اقبال ملک) is a Pakistani politician who has been a member of the Azad Kashmir Legislative Assembly since August 2021.

== Political career ==
Malik was elected to the Azad Kashmir Legislative Assembly from LA-8 Kotli-I as a candidate of Pakistan Tehreek-e-Insaf (PTI) in the 2021 Azad Kashmiri general election. He defeated Malik Muhmmad Nawaz Khan, a candidate of All Jammu and Kashmir Muslim Conference (AJKMC).

On 26 August 2021, he was sworn into the cabinet of Prime Minister Abdul Qayyum Khan Niazi as the Minister for Higher Education. He served in this position until the fall of Niazi's government on 14 April 2022.

On 25 April 2022, he was sworn into the cabinet of Prime Minister Tanveer Ilyas Khan as the Minister for Higher Education. He served in this position until the fall of Khan's government on 11 April 2023.

On 25 June 2023, he was sworn into the cabinet of Prime Minister Chaudhry Anwarul Haq as the Minister for Higher Education. He served in this position until the fall of Haq's government on 17 November 2025.

On 26 October 2025, he joined Pakistan People's Party (PPP).

On 19 November 2025, he was sworn into the cabinet of Prime Minister Faisal Mumtaz Rathore as the Minister for Higher Education.

He was re-elected to the Assembly from LA-8 Kotli-I as a candidate of PPP in the 2026 Azad Kashmiri general election. He received 19,994 votes, while the runner-up, Malik Muhammad Nawaz Khan of the Pakistan Muslim League (N), received 12,233 votes.
