= Muhammad Sayab Khalid Khan =

Pakistani politician (1940–2023)

- سیاب خالد خان

Speaker of the Azad Kashmir Legislative Assembly
- In office 24 July 2001 – 24 July 2006
- Deputy: Sanaullah Qadri
- Preceded by: Chaudhry Abdul Majid
- Succeeded by: Shah Ghulam Qadir

Member of the Azad Kashmir Legislative Assembly
- In office 2009 – 30 July 2016
- Preceded by: Khalid Ibrahim Khan
- Succeeded by: Sagheer Ahmed Khan Chughtai
- Constituency: LA-20 Poonch & Sudhnoti-IV
- In office 24 July 2001 – 24 July 2006
- Preceded by: Khalid Ibrahim Khan
- Succeeded by: Khalid Ibrahim Khan
- Constituency: LA-20 Poonch & Sudhnoti-IV
- In office 1986–1991
- Preceded by: Constituency established
- Succeeded by: Mehmood Ahmed
- Constituency: Reserved seat for technocrats

Personal details
- Party: Pakistan Tehreek-e-Insaf (2021-2023)
- Other political affiliations: All Jammu and Kashmir Muslim Conference (mid 1960s-2016); Pakistan Muslim League (N) (2016-2021)

Sardar Muhammad Sayab Khalid Khan (Urdu: محمد سیاب خالد خان; 26 March 1940 – 20 March 2023) was a Pakistani politician. He was the Speaker of the Azad Kashmir Legislative Assembly from 24 July 2001 through 24 July 2006. He also served as a member of the Assembly from July 2001 to July 2006 and from 2009 to July 2016.

== Early life ==
Khan was born on 26 March 1940 in Pachiot near Rawalakot, Azad Kashmir. His father, Sardar Muhammad Ayub Khan, was a civil servant in Revenue Department of Azad Kashmir who topped the departmental exam and his grandfather Sardar Kala Khan was awarded a special honorarium of respect by Maharaja of Kashmir. His father died when he was a toddler and his education pursuits were supervised by his eldest sister Begum Naqqi Nazir Sharif with the help of Justice S. M. Sharif Khan. He completed his law degree from the University of Peshawar.

== Political career ==
In 1986, after the addition of six reserved seats to the Azad Kashmir Legislative Assembly under the Seventh Amendment to the Interim Constitution of Azad Jammu and Kashmir, Khalid was elected from a reserved seat for technocrats as a candidate of All Jammu and Kashmir Muslim Conference (AJKMC).

He was re-elected to the Assembly from LA-20 Poonch & Sudhnoti-IV as a candidate of AJKMC in the 2001 Azad Kashmiri general election.

After taking oath as a member on 24 July 2001, he was elected as Speaker of the Assembly. He received votes and defeated a candidate of Pakistan People's Party (PPP).

He contested the 2006 Azad Kashmiri general election from LA-20 Poonch & Sudhnoti-IV as a candidate of AJKMC, but was unsuccessful. He was defeated by Khalid Ibrahim Khan, a candidate of Jammu Kashmir Peoples Party.

He was re-elected to the Assembly from LA-20 Poonch & Sudhnoti-IV as a candidate of AJKMC in a 2009 by-election.

On 29 October 2009, he was sworn into the cabinet of Prime Minister Farooq Haider Khan, and was made the Minister for Trade and Industry and Rawalakot City Development Project.

On 12 August 2010, he was sworn into the cabinet of Prime Minister Attique Ahmed Khan, and was made the Minister for Law, Justice and Parliamentary Affairs.

He was re-elected to he Assembly from LA-20 Poonch & Sudhnoti-IV as a candidate of AJKMC in the 2011 Azad Kashmiri general election.

On 17 July 2016, he joined Pakistan Muslim League (N) (PML(N)).

He joined Pakistan Tehreek-e-Insaf (PTI) ahead of the 2021 Azad Kashmiri general election.

On 24 January 2022, was elected to the Azad Jammu and Kashmir Council as a candidate of PTI, and secured 31 votes.

== Death ==
He died on 20 March 2023. He had a stroke before his death and was receiving medical treatment.
