= Abdul Majid Khan (Pakistani politician) =

Pakistani politician

- عبدالماجد خان

Member of the Azad Kashmir Legislative Assembly
- Incumbent
- Assumed office 24 July 2006
- Constituency: LA-45 Kashmir Valley-VI (2021-present); LA-41 Kashmir Valley-VI (2006-2021)

Personal details
- Party: Pakistan People's Party (2011-2016; 2025-present)
- Other political affiliations: Pakistan Tehreek-e-Insaf (2016-2025); All Jammu and Kashmir Muslim Conference (2006-2011); Independent (2006)
- Relations: Abdul Hamid Khan (grandfather)

Abdul Majid Khan (Urdu: عبدالماجد خان) is a Pakistani politician who has been a member of the Azad Kashmir Legislative Assembly since July 2006.

== Family ==
He is the son of Abdul Waheed Khan and Shireen Waheed, both former members of the Azad Kashmir Legislative Assembly. His father was elected from LA-40 Kashmir Valley-VI in the 1990 elections and LA-41 Kashmir Valley-VI in the 2001 elections, while his mother was elected from a reserved seat for women in the 1985, 1990, and 2001 elections. Both died in the 2005 Kashmir earthquake. Through his father, he was also the grandson of Abdul Hamid Khan, who served as the 1st Prime Minister of Azad Kashmir and 9th President of Azad Kashmir.

== Political career ==
Khan was elected to the Azad Kashmir Legislative Assembly from LA-41 Kashmir Valley-VI as an independent candidate in the 2006 Azad Kashmiri general election. He later joined All Jammu and Kashmir Muslim Conference (AJKMC).

On 15 March 2008, he was sworn into the cabinet of Prime Minister Attique Ahmed Khan, and was made the Advisor for Technical Education and Vocational Training Authority (TEVTA), Information Technology and Muzaffarabad City Development Project. On 12 December 2008, he was removed from the cabinet amid rumours that he, as a member of a forward bloc, was planning a motion of no confidence against the Prime Minister.

On 14 January 2009, he was sworn into the cabinet of Prime Minister Muhammad Yaqoob Khan, and was made the Minister for Information, Azad Kashmir Logging and Sawmills Corporation (AKLASC), and Azad Kashmir Mineral and Industrial Development Corporation (AKMIDC).

On 12 August 2010, he was sworn into the cabinet of Prime Minister Attique Ahmed Khan, and was made the Minister for AKLASC.

In May 2011, he joined Pakistan People's Party (PPP).

He was re-elected to the Assembly from LA-41 Kashmir Valley-VI as a candidate of PPP in the 2011 Azad Kashmiri general election. He received 497 votes and defeated Noor-ul-Baari, a candidate of Jamaat-e-Islami (JI).

On 2 August 2011, he was sworn into the cabinet of Prime Minister Chaudhry Abdul Majid, and was made the Minister for Rehabilitation. On 22 July 2013, he resigned from the cabinet after moving a motion of no confidence against the Prime Minister. However, on 26 July, he withdrew his motion. On 5 September 2013, he was sworn back into the cabinet. On 23 May 2016, he was removed from the cabinet for voting in favour of an opposition candidate in an election to the Azad Jammu and Kashmir Council.

On 1 June 2016, he joined Pakistan Tehreek-e-Insaf (PTI).

He was re-elected to the Assembly from LA-41 Kashmir Valley-VI as a candidate of Pakistan Tehreek-e-Insaf (PTI) in the 2016 Azad Kashmiri general election. He received 2,687 votes and defeated Noor-ul-Baari, a candidate of JI.

He was re-elected to the Assembly from LA-45 Kashmir Valley-VI as a candidate of PTI in the 2021 Azad Kashmiri general election. He received 3,138 votes and defeated Abdul Nasir Khan, an independent candidate.

On 26 August 2021, he was sworn into the cabinet of Prime Minister Abdul Qayyum Khan Niazi, and was made the Minister for Finance and Inland Revenue.

On 25 April 2022, he was sworn into the cabinet of Prime Minister Tanveer Ilyas Khan, and was made the Minister for Finance, Inland Revenue, and Cooperatives.

On 25 June 2023, he was sworn into the cabinet of Prime Minister Chaudhry Anwarul Haq, and was made the Minister for Finance and Cooperatives.

On 17 October 2025, he resigned from the cabinet in protest against an agreement signed between a federal government committee and the Jammu Kashmir Joint Awami Action Committee.

On 26 October 2025, he re-joined PPP.

He was re-elected to the Assembly from LA-45 Kashmir Valley-VI as a candidate of PPP in the 2026 Azad Kashmiri general election. He received 3,448 votes, while the runner-up, Khawaja Muhammad Dilawar of All Jammu and Kashmir Muslim Conference (AJKMC), received 823 votes.
