= Constituency LA-33 =

Constituency in Azad Kashmir, Pakistan

Constituency LA-33 (Hattian Bala-II) Jehlum Velly Hattian Bala
- Jehlum valley hattian bala ajk constituency for the Azad Kashmir Legislative Assembly
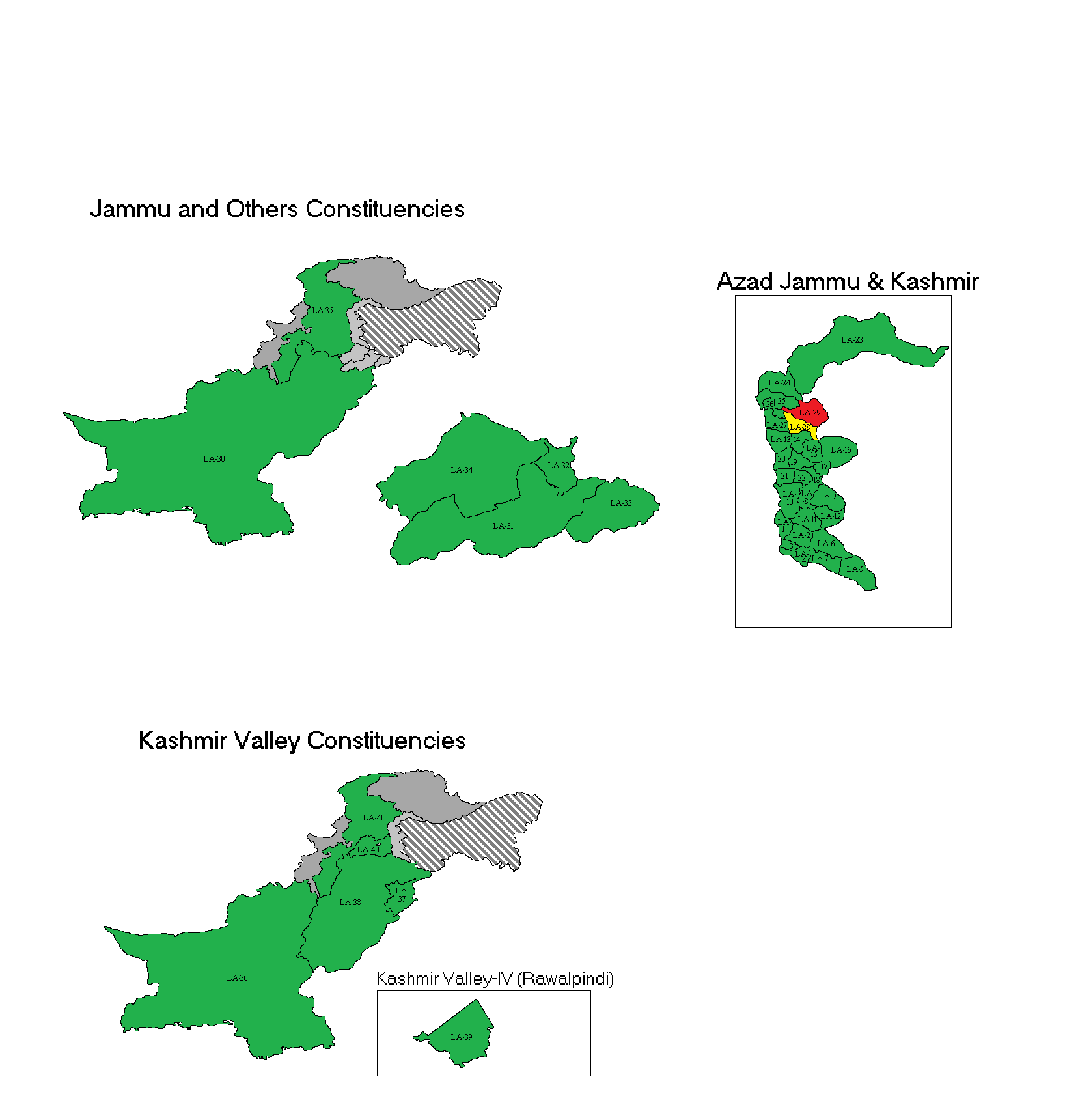
- District: Hattian Bala District
- Province: Azad Kashmir
- Electorate: 67,868

Current constituency
- Party: Ppp
- Member: Deewan Ali Khan Chughtai ([[Pakistan people's party])PPP)

LA-33 (Muzaffarabad-VII/Hattian Bala) is a constituency of the Azad Jammu and Kashmir Legislative Assembly representing parts of Hattian Bala District and Muzaffarabad District in Azad Jammu and Kashmir, Pakistan. It is currently represented by Dewan Ali Khan Chughtai of the Pakistan Peoples Party (PPP), who was elected in the 2 August 2026 Azad Kashmir Legislative Assembly election. Dewan Ali Khan Chughtai previously won the seat as a Pakistan Tehreek-e-Insaf (PTI) candidate in the 2021 Azad Kashmir Legislative Assembly election and later joined the Pakistan Peoples Party (PPP) before contesting and winning the 2026 election. Muzaffarabad District of Azad Kashmir, Pakistan.

== Election 2016 ==
elections were held in this constituency on 21 July 2016.

Azad Kashmir Election 2016: LA-29 (Hattian Bala-II)
Party	Candidate	Votes	%	±%
PML(N)	Mustafa Bashir Khan	22,186		
PPP	Ch. Muhammad Rasheed	18,776		
Muslim Conference	Dewan Ali Khan	15,360		
KTI	Liaqat Qayyum Abbasi	92		
Independent	Muneer Akhtar	82		
Independent	Chaudhary Muhammad Shafi	64		
Independent	Naveed Ahmad Abbasi	40		
MWM	Syed Iftikhar Hussain Shah	20		
Independent	Atiq Ur Rehman Awan	15		
Turnout		53,636		

== Election 2021 ==
Further Information: Azad Kashmir Election 2021

Dewan Ali Khan|Deewan Ali Khan Chughtai of Pakistan Tehreek-e-Insaf own the seat by getting 26474 votes. He defeated the incumbent Prime Minister of Azad Kashmir Raja Muhammad Farooq Haider Khan by a margin of 12,090 votes.

Azad Kashmir Election 2021: LA-33 Hattian Bala-II
Party	Candidate	Votes	%	±%
PTI	Dewan Ali Khan Chughtai	26,474	53.6	▲
PML(N)	Raja Muhammad Farooq Haider Khan	14384	29.1	▼
PPP	Muhammad Javed	5739	11.6	▼
TLP	Abdul Razaq	811	1.6	▲
JI	Syed Ali Imad-ul-Islam	491	1	▼
All Jammu and Kashmir Muslim Conference	Ali Khan	407	0.8	▼
JUI (F)	Mukhtar Ahmed Kiani	284	0.6	▼
others and independent	3 candidates	363	0.7	▼
Majority		12090	24.5	▲
Rejected ballots		461	0.9	Steady
Turnout		49414	72.81	▲
PTI gain from PML(N)				
