= Chaudhry Azhar Sadiq =

Pakistani politician

- چوہدری اظہر صادق

Member of the Azad Kashmir Legislative Assembly
- Incumbent
- Assumed office 3 August 2021
- Constituency: LA-1 Mirpur-I

Personal details
- Party: Pakistan Muslim League (N) (2026-present)
- Other political affiliations: Pakistan Tehreek-e-Insaf (2016-2026)

Chaudhry Azhar Sadiq (Urdu: چوہدری اظہر صادق) is a Pakistani politician who has been a member of the Azad Kashmir Legislative Assembly since August 2021.

== Political career ==
Sadiq contested the 2016 Azad Kashmiri general election from LA-1 Mirpur-I as a candidate of Pakistan Tehreek-e-Insaf (PTI), but was unsuccessful. He received 6,435 votes, placing third, and was defeated by Chaudhry Masood Khalid, a candidate of Pakistan Muslim League (N) (PML(N)).

He was elected to the Azad Kashmir Legislative Assembly from LA-1 Mirpur-I as a candidate of PTI in the 2021 Azad Kashmiri general election. He received 14,233 votes and defeated Chaudhry Masood Khalid, a candidate of PML(N).

He was sworn into the cabinet of Prime Minister Abdul Qayyum Khan Niazi as the Minister for Communication and Works. He served in this position until the fall of Niazi's government on 14 April 2022.

On 25 April 2022, he was sworn into the cabinet of Prime Minister Tanveer Ilyas Khan as the Minister for Communication and Works. He served in this position until the fall of Khan's government on 11 April 2023.

On 25 June 2023, he was sworn into the cabinet of Prime Minister Chaudhry Anwarul Haq as the Minister for Communication and Works. He served in this position until the fall of Haq's government on 17 November 2025.

He was re-elected to the Assembly from LA-1 Mirpur-I as a candidate of the PML(N) in the 2026 Azad Kashmiri general election. He received 15,427 votes, while the runner-up, Muhammad Afsar Shahid of the Pakistan Peoples Party, received 9,832 votes.

On 4 September 2026, he was sworn into the cabinet of Prime Minister Ifitikhar Gilani.
