= Chaudhry Qasim Majeed =

Pakistani politician

- چوہدری قاسم مجید

Member of the Azad Kashmir Legislative Assembly
- Incumbent
- Assumed office 3 August 2021
- Constituency: LA-2 Mirpur-II

Personal details
- Party: Pakistan People's Party
- Parent: Chaudhry Abdul Majid (father)

Chaudhry Qasim Majeed (Urdu: چوہدری قاسم مجید) is a Pakistani politician who has been a member of the Azad Kashmir Legislative Assembly since August 2021. He is also the son of Chaudhry Abdul Majid, the former Prime Minister of Azad Kashmir.

== Political career ==
Majeed was elected to the Azad Kashmir Legislative Assembly from LA-2 Mirpur-II as a candidate of the Pakistan People's Party (PPP) in the 2021 Azad Kashmiri general election. He received 10,377 votes and defeated Zafar Anwar, a candidate of Pakistan Tehreek-e-Insaf (PTI).

On 25 June 2023, he was sworn into the cabinet of Prime Minister Chaudhry Anwarul Haq as the Minister for Mangla Dam Housing Authority. He served in this position until the fall of Haq's government on 17 November 2025.

On 19 November 2025, he was sworn into the cabinet of Prime Minister Faisal Mumtaz Rathore as the Minister for Finance and Inland Revenue.

He was re-elected to the Assembly from LA-2 Mirpur-II as a candidate of the PPP in the 2026 Azad Kashmiri general election. He received 13,376 votes, while the runner-up, Chaudhry Azeem Bakhsh of the Pakistan Muslim League (N) (PML(N)), received 8,299 votes.

After the election, he was nominated by PPP for the position of Speaker of the Assembly, but was unsuccessful. He received 13 votes and was defeated by Chaudhry Tariq Farooq of PML(N).
