= LA-45 Kashmir Valley-VI =

Constituency of the Azad Kashmir Legislative Assembly

- Constituency for the Azad Kashmir Legislative Assembly
- District: Khyber Pakhtunkhwa
- Electorate: 6,951

Current constituency
- Party: Pakistan People's Party
- Member: Abdul Majid Khan
- Created from: LA-41 Kashmir Valley-VI

LA-45 Kashmir Valley-VI is a constituency of the Azad Kashmir Legislative Assembly which is currently represented by Abdul Majid Khan of Pakistan People's Party (PPP). It covers the area of Khyber Pakhtunkhwa. Only refugees from the Kashmir Valley settled in Pakistan are eligible to vote in this constituency.

== Election 2016 ==
General elections were held in this constituency on 21 July 2016.

General election 2016: LA-41 Kashmir Valley-VI
Party	Candidate	Votes	%	±%
PTI	Abdul Majid Khan	2,687	63.10	
JI	Noor Ul Bari	980	23.02	
PPP	Abdur Rehman Sulharia	515	12.09	
JUI (F)	Muhammad Fayyaz Sulhariya	76	1.78	
Turnout		4,258		

== Election 2021 ==
Abdul Majid Khan of the Pakistan Tehreek-e-Insaf (PTI) won the seat by obtaining 3,138 votes.

General election 2021: LA-45 Kashmir Valley-VI
Party	Candidate	Votes	%	±%
PTI	Abdul Majid Khan	3,138	57.10	▼6.00
Independent	Abdul Nasir Khan	2,063	37.54	▲37.54
JI	Noor Ul Bari	292	5.31	▼17.71
Independent	Ahmad Mushahid Mushtaq	3	0.05	
Turnout		5,496	79.07	
Majority		1,075	19.56	
Registered electors		6,951		
PTI hold				

== Election 2026 ==
General elections were held on 2 August 2026. Abdul Majid Khan won the election with 2,308 votes.

General election 2026: LA-45 Kashmir Valley-VI
Party	Candidate	Votes	%	±%
PPP	Abdul Majid Khan	3,448	74.55	
AJKMC	Khawaja Muhammad Dilawar	823	17.79	
JI	Abdul Hameed Butt	242	5.23	▼0.08
Others	Others (four candidates)	112	2.42	
Turnout		4,675	61.07	▼18.02
Total valid votes		4,625	98.93	
Rejected ballots		50	1.07	
Majority		2,625	56.76	
Registered electors		7,655		
PPP gain from PTI				
