= LA-8 Kotli-I =

Electoral district in Azad Jammu and Kashmir

- Constituency for the Azad Kashmir Legislative Assembly
- District: Kotli District
- Electorate: 73,121

Current constituency
- Party: Pakistan Tehreek-e-Insaf
- Member: Zaffar Iqbal Malik

LA-8 Kotli-I is a constituency of Azad Kashmir Legislative Assembly which is currently represented by Zaffar Iqbal Malik of the Pakistan Tehreek-e-Insaf (PTI). It covers half of Kotli Tehsil in Kotli District.

== Election 2016 ==
General elections were held on 21 July 2016.

General election 2016: LA-8 Kotli-I
Party	Candidate	Votes	%	±%
AJKMC	Malik Muhammad Nawaz	23,577		
PML(N)	Malik Muhammad Yusaf	22,356		
PPP	Muhammad Ilyas Chaudry	7,880		
Independent	Muhammad Masood Raza	534		
JUI (F)	Ibrar Mughal	93		
Independent	Altaf Hussain	89		
Independent	Mobushir Ali	79		
Sunni Ittehad Council	Abdul Rehman Khan	52		
Independent	Abdul Hammed	30		
Turnout		54,690		

== Election 2021 ==
General election 2021: LA-8 Kotli-I
Party	Candidate	Votes	%	±%
PTI	Zafar Iqbal Malik	17,299	36.53	
AJKMC	Malik Muhammad Nawaz Khan	12,107	25.57	
PML(N)	Zulfiqar Ali	7,598	16.05	
TLP	Malik Zaheer Ahmad	4,181	8.83	
PPP	Muhammad Aftab Anjum	2,818	5.95	
Independent	Chaudhry Muhammad Zaman	2,007	4.24	
Others	Others (seven candidates)	1,341	2.83	
Turnout		47,351	64.76	
Majority		5,192	10.97	
Registered electors		73,121		
PTI gain from AJKMC				

== Election 2026 ==
General elections were held on 27 July 2026. Zafar Iqbal Malik of Pakistan People's Party (PPP) won the election with 19,994 votes.

General election 2026: LA-8 Kotli-I
Party	Candidate	Votes	%	±%
PPP	Zafar Iqbal Malik	19,994	52.39	▲46.44
PML(N)	Malik Muhammad Nawaz Khan	12,233	32.05	▲16.00
Independent	Farhat Arshad	2,128	5.58	
IPP	Zulfiqar Ali	1,820	4.77	
Others	Others (fifteen candidates)	1,988	5.21	
Turnout		38,793	42.95	▼21.81
Total valid votes		38,163	98.38	
Rejected ballots		630	1.62	
Majority		7,761	20.34	
Registered electors		90,327		
PPP gain from PTI				
