= Mazhar Saeed Shah =

Pakistani politician

Mawlānā Peer Mazhar Saeed Shah
- پیر مظہر سعید شاہ

Information Minister of AJK
- In office May 23, 2024 – Oct 14, 2025
- President: Sultan Mehmood Chaudhry
- Prime Minister: Chaudhry Anwar-ul-Haq

Member of the Azad Kashmir Assembly
- Incumbent
- Assumed office 3 August 2021
- Constituency: Reserved seat for Ulema

Personal details
- Born: 13 January 1975 (age 51) Karachi, Sindh, Pakistan
- Party: PML(N) (2026–present)
- Other political affiliations: JEM (2000–2004); MMA (2006–2007); JUI (2016–2019); PTI (2021–2023); IND (2023–2026)
- Relations: Abu Lubaba Shah Mansoor (Brother)
- Education: Jamia Uloom-ul-Islamia; Jamia Binoria; Karachi University

Mazhar Saeed Shah (Urdu: مظہر سعید شاہ) formerly known by the nom de guerre Abdullah Shah Mazhar (Urdu: عبد الله شاه مظهر) is a Pakistani Islamic scholar, former militant leader and politician from Neelum Valley of Azad Kashmir who served as the Minister for Information of AJK and is a member of the Azad Kashmir Assembly since 2021.

== Early life and education ==
He graduated from Jamia Binoria, Karachi and also holds an MA degree from Karachi University.

He is the younger brother of Mufti Abu Lubaba Shah Mansoor and the maternal grandson of Anwar Shah Kashmiri.

== Political career ==
In 2006, Mazhar participated in the elections from Neelam Valley on the ticket of Muttahida Majlis-e-Amal and got 4000 votes.

In 2011, Mazhar once again entered electoral politics but withdrew due to his party's alliance with the Muslim Conference. However, after that he withdrew from practical politics at the local level.

In 2021, Mazhar developed ties with Pakistan Tehreek-e-Insaf and got a ticket for a reserved seat for Ulema, in exchange for PTI's support in the 2021 Azad Kashmiri general election. In 2023, Mazhar ended his alliance with the Tehreek-e-Insaaf.

In 2023, Mazhar came into the limelight once again when Pakistan Democratic Movement chief Maulana Fazlur Rehman visited the Neelum Valley. During this visit the Maulana was hosted by him, and both of them addressed many public gatherings together.

In August 2025, Mazhar attended a religious event in Bangladesh hosted by Sirat Committee as a special guest. He discussed about religious harmony and peaceful coexistence.

He was re-elected to the Azad Kashmir Legislative Assembly on a reserved seat for Ulema as a candidate of Pakistan Muslim League (N) (PML(N)) in the 2026 Azad Kashmiri general election.

== Gaza Flotilla ==
In September 2025, Mazhar joined the Global Sumud Flotilla along with five others, including former senator Mushtaq Ahmad Khan. The flotilla was a civilian-led effort to deliver humanitarian aid to the Gaza Strip and to break through the Israeli naval blockade.

Mazhar was forced to abandon the journey after his vessel experienced technical failure and no replacement ships were available.

On 6 October 2025, Mazhar returned to Pakistan, arriving at Islamabad International Airport via a flight from Doha.

== Militancy era ==
In 2021, when Mazhar became a candidate for the AJK legislative assembly, many in the opposition to the ruling Tehreek-e-Insaaf party, including PPP's Bilawal Bhutto Zardari, criticized the move, alleging Mazhar's former association with jihadi groups, including the Afghan Taliban.

Mazhar himself later acknowledged his presence in Afghanistan under Taliban rule but denied any "official post", and also confirmed being a "key leader" of Masood Azhar's Jaish-e-Mohammed.

== See also ==
- List of Deobandis
