= LA-1 Mirpur-I =

Constituency of the Azad Kashmir Legislative Assembly

- Constituency for the Azad Kashmir Legislative Assembly
- District: Mirpur District
- Electorate: 93,480

Current constituency
- Party: Pakistan Muslim League (N)
- Member: Chaudhry Azhar Sadiq

LA-1 Mirpur-I is a constituency of the Azad Kashmir Legislative Assembly which is currently represented by Chaudhry Azhar Sadiq. It covers the area of Dadyal in Mirpur District.

== Election 2016 ==
General elections were held on 21 July 2016.

General election 2016: LA-1 Mirpur-I
Party	Candidate	Votes	%	±%
PML(N)	Masood Khalid	12,606	36.95	
PPP	Muhammad Afsar Shahid	7,590	22.25	
PTI	Chaudhry Azhar Sadiq	6,435	18.86	
Independent	Wajid Ur Rehman	3,363	9.86	
Independent	Aftab Ahmed	2,956	8.67	
Independent	Gulham Rabbani Baraq	849	2.49	
Independent	Sagheer Hussain	89	0.26	
Independent	Waqar Ahmed	76	0.22	
Independent	Luqman Anjum Sultan	67	0.20	
Sunni Ittehad Council	Luqman Hussain	39	0.11	
Independent	Arif Gulzair	14	0.04	
Independent	Zafar Khan	9	0.03	
Independent	Zahoor Ahmed	8	0.02	
Independent	Tahir Qayyum	7	0.02	
Independent	Khadim Hussain	5	0.01	
Turnout		34,113		

== Election 2021 ==
General elections were held on 25 July 2021.

General election 2021: LA-1 Mirpur-I
Party	Candidate	Votes	%	±%
PTI	Chaudhry Azhar Sadiq	14,233	37.08	▲18.22
PML(N)	Chaudhry Masood Khalid	7,609	19.82	▼17.13
Independent	Shoaib Abid	5,802	15.11	
PPP	Muhammad Afsar Shahid	4,168	10.86	▼11.39
TLP	Faisal Ahmed Mushtaq	2,433	6.34	▲6.34
Independent	Raja Ali Zaman	1,189	3.10	
AJKMC	Ghulam Rabbani	1,121	2.92	▲2.92
Independent	Muhammad Jahangir Akbar	1,052	2.74	
Others	Others (twelve candidates)	779	2.03	
Turnout		38,386	41.06	
Majority		6,624	17.26	
Registered electors		93,480		
PTI gain from PML(N)				

== Election 2026 ==
General elections were held on 27 July 2026. Chaudhry Azhar Sadiq of Pakistan Muslim League (N) (PML(N)) won the election with 15,427 votes.

General election 2026: LA-1 Mirpur-I
Party	Candidate	Votes	%	±%
PML(N)	Chaudhry Azhar Sadiq	15,427	57.44	▲37.62
PPP	Muhammad Afsar Shahid	9,832	36.61	▲25.75
Independent	Junaid Ali	860	3.20	
Others	Others (seventeen candidates)	738	2.75	
Total valid votes		26,857	95.22	
Rejected ballots		1,347	4.78	
Turnout		28,204	26.82	▼14.24
Majority		5,595	20.83	
Registered electors		105,174		
PML(N) gain from PTI				
