= LA-17 Bagh-IV =

Constituency of the Azad Kashmir Legislative Assembly

- Constituency for the Azad Kashmir Legislative Assembly
- District: Haveli District
- Electorate: 97,902

Current constituency
- Party: Pakistan People's Party
- Member: Faisal Mumtaz Rathore
- Created from: LA-16 Bagh-IV

LA-17 Bagh-IV is a constituency of the Azad Kashmir Legislative Assembly which is currently represented by Faisal Mumtaz Rathore of Pakistan People's Party (PPP). It covers the whole area of Haveli District.

== Election 2016 ==
General elections were held on 21 July 2016.

General election 2016: LA-16 Bagh-IV
Party	Candidate	Votes	%	±%
PML(N)	Chaudhary Muhammad Aziz	34,313	58.04	
PPP	Khawja Tariq Saeed	24,124	40.81	
PTI	Zahid Iqbal Hashmi	380	0.64	
Independent	Syed Majid Gillani	94	0.16	
Independent	Baba Nazeer	84	0.14	
JI	Syed Aftab Hussain Shah	82	0.14	
Independent	Ikhlaq ur Rehman Khan	37	0.06	
Independent	Mukhtar Ahmad Awan	6	0.01	
Turnout		59,120		

== Election 2021 ==
General elections were held on 25 July 2021.

General election 2021: LA-17 Bagh-IV
Party	Candidate	Votes	%	±%
PPP	Faisal Mumtaz Rathore	30,085	41.96	▲1.15
PML(N)	Chaudhry Muhammad Aziz	25,421	35.45	▼22.59
PTI	Amir Nazir Chaudhry	12,734	17.76	▲17.12
Others	Others (nine candidates)	2,795	3.90	
Turnout		71,035	72.56	
Majority		4,664	6.50	
Registered electors		97,902		
PPP gain from PML(N)				

== Election 2026 ==
General elections were held on 10 August 2026. Faisal Mumtaz Rathore won the election with 33,872 votes.

General election 2026: LA-17 Bagh-IV
Party	Candidate	Votes	%	±%
PPP	Faisal Mumtaz Rathore	33,872	39.99	▼1.97
PML(N)	Chaudhry Mohsin Aziz	32,354	38.20	▲2.75
Independent	Khawaja Tariq Saeed	12,538	14.80	
IPP	Amir Nazir Chaudhry	5,405	6.38	
Others	Others (five candidates)	533	0.63	
Turnout		85,166	72.47	▼0.09
Total valid votes		84,702	99.46	
Rejected ballots		464	0.54	
Majority		1,518	1.79	
Registered electors		117,514		
PPP hold				
