= LA-5 Bhimber-I =

Electoral district in Azad Jammu and Kashmir

- Constituency for the Azad Kashmir Legislative Assembly
- District: Bhimber District
- Electorate: 75,004

Current constituency
- Member: Waqar Ahmad Noor (PML (N))

LA-5 Bhimber-I is a constituency of Azad Kashmir Legislative Assembly which is currently represented by Waqar Ahmad Noor of the Pakistan Muslim League (N) (PML(N)). It covers the area of Barnala Tehsil in Bhimber District.

== Election 2016 ==
General elections were held on 21 July 2016.

General election 2016: LA-5 Bhimber-I
Party	Candidate	Votes	%	±%
PML(N)	Waqar Ahmed Noor	21,026	41.15	
PPP	Pervaiz Ashraf	17,350	33.95	
AJKMC	Muhammad Shafique Jarral	11,293	22.10	
Independent	Muhammad Malik	1,048	2.05	
Awami Tehreek	Allah Ditta	125	0.24	
Sunni Ittehad Council	Hafiz Kabir Hussain	106	0.21	
Independent	Laiq Mehmmod Amir	42	0.08	
Independent	Shafeeq ur Rehman	29	0.06	
Independent	Rashid Ali	26	0.05	
Independent	Muhammad Mushtaq Rahi	23	0.05	
Independent	Muhammad Sadiq Jaral	21	0.04	
Independent	Ifthikhar Hussain	10	0.02	
Independent	Waleed Ashraf	0	0.00	
Turnout		51,099		

== Election 2021 ==
General elections were held on 25 July 2021.

General election 2021: LA-5 Bhimber-I
Party	Candidate	Votes	%	±%
PML(N)	Waqar Ahmed Noor	21,799	36.54	▼4.61
PPP	Pervaiz Ashraf	15,583	26.12	▼7.83
AJKMC	Muhammad Shafique Jarral	14,911	24.99	▲2.89
PTI	Chaudhry Anwaar-ul-Haq Noor	3,481	5.83	▲5.83
TLP	Muhammad Khurshid	3,084	5.17	▲5.17
Others	Others (nine candidates)	808	1.35	
Turnout		59,666	72.22	
Majority		6,216	10.42	
Registered electors		82,620		
PML(N) hold				

== Election 2026 ==
General elections were held on 27 July 2026. Waqar Ahmed Noor of Pakistan Muslim League (N) (PML(N)) won the election with 29,821 votes.

General election 2026: LA-5 Bhimber-I
Party	Candidate	Votes	%	±%
PML(N)	Waqar Ahmed Noor	29,821	48.36	▲11.82
PPP	Chaudhry Pervaiz Ashraf	29,100	47.19	▲21.07
Others	Others (sixteen candidates)	2,747	4.45	
Turnout		62,546	60.17	▼12.05
Total valid votes		61,668	98.60	
Rejected ballots		878	1.40	
Majority		721	1.17	
Registered electors		103,956		
PML(N) hold				
