= Sehrish Qamar Malik =

Pakistani politician

- سحرش قمر ملک

Member of the Azad Kashmir Legislative Assembly
- Incumbent
- Assumed office 24 August 2026
- Constituency: Reserved seat for women
- In office 30 July 2016 – 3 August 2021
- Constituency: Reserved seat for women

Personal details
- Party: Pakistan Muslim League (N)

Sehrish Qamar Malik (Urdu: سحرش قمر ملک) is a Pakistani politician who has been a member of the Azad Kashmir Legislative Assembly since August 2026. She previously served as a member of the Assembly from July 2016 to August 2021.

== Political career ==
Malik was elected to the Azad Kashmir Legislative Assembly on a reserved seat for women in the 2016 Azad Kashmiri general election as a candidate of Pakistan Muslim League (N) (PML(N)).

She was re-elected to the Assembly on a reserved seat for women in the 2026 Azad Kashmiri general election as a candidate of the PML(N).
