= LA-9 Kotli-II =

Electoral district in Azad Jammu and Kashmir

- Constituency for the Azad Kashmir Legislative Assembly
- District: Kotli District
- Electorate: 84,622

Current constituency
- Party: Pakistan People's Party
- Member: Chaudhry Javed Iqbal Budhanvi

LA-9 Kotli-II is a constituency of the Azad Kashmir Legislative Assembly which is currently represented by Chaudhry Javed Iqbal Budhanvi of the Pakistan People's Party (PPP). It covers the area of Fatehpur Thakiala (Nakyal) in Kotli District.

== Election 2016 ==
General elections were held on 21 July 2016.

General election 2016: LA-9 Kotli-II
Party	Candidate	Votes	%	±%
PML(N)	Farooq Sikander Khan	26,877		
PPP	Chaudhry Javed Iqbal Budhanvi	24,183		
PTI	Muhammad Naeem Khan	2,168		
AJKMC	Sikandar Khizer Hayat Khan	265		
Pakistan Tehreek-e-Insaf Nazariati	Abdur Rehman	310		
Independent	Malik Karamat Hussain	110		
Turnout		54,273		

== Election 2021 ==
General elections were held on 25 July 2021.

General election 2021: LA-9 Kotli-II
Party	Candidate	Votes	%	±%
PPP	Chaudhry Javed Iqbal Budhanvi	24,276	43.35	
AJKMC	Sardar Muhammad Naeem Khan	19,484	34.79	
PTI	Asif Hanif	5,273	9.42	
TLP	Muhammad Shabeer Tabassum	3,029	5.41	
PML(N)	Munir Hussain Khan	2,164	3.86	
Independent	Sardar Khizar Hayat Khan	1,453	2.59	
Others	Others (nine candidates)	321	0.57	
Turnout		56,000	66.18	
Majority		4,792	8.56	
Registered electors		84,622		
PPP gain from PML(N)				

== Election 2026 ==
General elections were held on 27 July 2026. Umair Naeem of Pakistan Muslim League (N) (PML(N)) won the election with 31,680 votes.

General election 2026: LA-9 Kotli-II
Party	Candidate	Votes	%	±%
PML(N)	Umair Naeem	31,680	51.61	▲47.75
PPP	Chaudhry Javed Iqbal Budhanvi	29,098	47.40	▲4.05
Others	Others (nine candidates)	604	0.98	
Turnout		61,425	59.51	▼6.67
Total valid votes		61,382	99.93	
Rejected ballots		43	0.07	
Majority		2,582	4.21	
Registered electors		103,211		
PML(N) gain from PPP				
