= LA-4 Mirpur-IV =

Constituency of the Azad Kashmir Legislative Assembly

- Constituency for the Azad Kashmir Legislative Assembly
- District: Mirpur District
- Electorate: 87,040

Current constituency
- Party: Pakistan Tehreek-e-Insaf
- Member: Chaudhry Arshad Hussain

LA-4 Mirpur-IV is a constituency of Azad Kashmir Legislative Assembly which is currently represented by the Chaudary Arshad Hussain of the Pakistan Tehreek-e-Insaf (PTI). It covers the area of Khari Sharif in Mirpur District.

== Election 2016 ==
General elections were held on 21 July 2016.

General election 2016: LA-4 Mirpur-IV
Party	Candidate	Votes	%	±%
PML(N)	Chaudhry Rukhsar Ahmed	21,937	50.46	
PTI	Chaudry Arshad Hussain	17,066	39.26	
AJKMC	Zafar Maroof	3,723	8.56	
PPP	Sheraz Akram	667	1.53	
Independent	Junaid Akhtar	29	0.07	
Independent	Zahid Mehmmod	19	0.04	
Independent	Naveed Akhtar	10	0.02	
Independent	Muhammad Arif Chaudry	8	0.02	
Independent	Ibrahim Shahrayar Azam	8	0.02	
Independent	Sultan Mazhar Sabtain	5	0.01	
Turnout		43,472		

== Election 2021 ==
General elections were held on 25 July 2021.

General election 2021: LA-4 Mirpur-IV
Party	Candidate	Votes	%	±%
PTI	Chaudhry Arshad Hussain	22,768	44.66	▲5.40
PML(N)	Chaudhry Rukhsar Ahmed	20,984	41.16	▼9.30
TLP	Abdul Aziz Chaudhry	3,750	7.36	▲7.36
AJKMC	Raja Masood Rauf	1,313	2.58	▼5.98
Others	Others (twelve candidates)	2,169	4.25	
Turnout		50,984	58.58	
Majority		1,784	3.50	
Registered electors		87,040		
PTI gain from PML(N)				

== Election 2026 ==
General elections were held on 27 July 2026. Chaudhry Rukhsar Ahmed of Pakistan Muslim League (N) (PML(N)) won the election with 22,376 votes.

General election 2026: LA-4 Mirpur-IV
Party	Candidate	Votes	%	±%
PML(N)	Chaudhry Rukhsar Ahmed	22,376	52.08	▲10.92
PPP	Sohaib Arshad	15,851	36.89	▲35.53
IPP	Taimoor Hassan Farooq	2,734	6.36	
Others	Others	2,007	4.67	
Turnout		45,192	45.36	▼13.22
Total valid votes		42,968	95.08	
Rejected ballots		2,224	4.92	
Majority		6,525	15.19	
Registered electors		99,624		
PML(N) gain from PTI				
