= Waqar Ahmed Noor =

Pakistani politician

- وقار احمد نور

Member of the Azad Kashmir Legislative Assembly
- Incumbent
- Assumed office 30 July 2016
- Constituency: LA-5 Bhimber-I

Personal details
- Born: 1963(age 64-65) Barnala Bhimber Azad Kashmir
- Party: Pakistan Muslim League (N) (PML-N)
- Parent: Lt. Col. Chaudhary Abdul Ghani Noor (father)

Waqar Ahmed Noor (Urdu: وقار احمد نور) is a Pakistani politician from Azad Jammu and Kashmir who has been elected for the 3rd consecutive term of the Azad Kashmir Legislative Assembly since 30 July 2016. He represents LA-5 Bhimber-I as a member of Pakistan Muslim League N.

== Political career ==
Noor was elected to the Azad Kashmir Legislative Assembly from LA-5 Bhimber-I as a candidate of Pakistan Muslim League (N) (PML(N)) in the 2016 Azad Kashmiri general election. He received 21,026 votes and defeated Chaudhry Pervaiz Ashraf, a candidate of Pakistan People's Party (PPP).

On 14 April 2018, he was sworn into the cabinet of Prime Minister Raja Farooq Haider Khan as the Minister for Planning and Development. After a cabinet re-shuffle on 7 November 2018, he was made the Minister for Higher Education. He served in this position until the expiry of Khan's government on 30 July 2021.

He was re-elected to the Assembly from LA-5 Bhimber-I as a candidate of PML(N) in the 2021 Azad Kashmiri general election. He received 21,799 votes and defeated Chaudhry Pervaiz Ashraf, a candidate of PPP.

On 20 April 2023, he was sworn into the cabinet of Prime Minister Chaudhry Anwarul Haq as the Senior Most Minister with the Portfolios of S&GAD & the Interior Ministry. He served in this position until the fall of Haq's government on 17 November 2025.

He was re-elected to the Assembly from LA-5 Bhimber-I as a candidate of the PML(N) in the 2026 Azad Kashmiri general election. He received 29,821 votes, while the runner-up, Chaudhry Pervaiz Ashraf of the PPP, received 29,100 votes.

On 4 September 2026, he was sworn into the cabinet of Prime Minister Ifitikhar Gilani.
