= Chaudhry Rukhsar Ahmed =

Pakistani politician

- چوہدری رخسار احمد

Member of the Azad Kashmir Legislative Assembly
- Incumbent
- Assumed office 24 August 2026
- Preceded by: Chaudhry Arshad Hussain
- Constituency: LA-4 Mirpur-IV
- In office 30 July 2016 – 3 August 2021
- Preceded by: Chaudhry Arshad Hussain
- Succeeded by: Chaudhry Arshad Hussain
- Constituency: LA-4 Mirpur-IV
- In office 24 July 2006 – 25 July 2011
- Succeeded by: Chaudhry Arshad Hussain
- Constituency: LA-4 Mirpur-IV

Personal details
- Party: Pakistan Muslim League (N) (PML-N) (2016-present)
- Other political affiliations: All Jammu and Kashmir Muslim Conference (2006-2011)

Chaudhry Rukhsar Ahmed (Urdu: چوہدری رخسار احمد) is a Pakistani politician who has been a member of the Azad Kashmir Legislative Assembly since August 2026. He previously served as a member of the Assembly from July 2006 to July 2011, and from July 2016 to August 2021.

== Political career ==
Ahmed was elected to the Azad Kashmir Legislative Assembly from LA-4 Mirpur-IV as a candidate of All Jammu and Kashmir Muslim Conference (AJKMC) in the 2006 Azad Kashmiri general election.

On 7 March 2008, he was sworn into the cabinet of Prime Minister Attique Ahmed Khan. He was made Minister for Zakat, Ushr, Auqaf and Islamic Ideology Council.

On 14 January 2009, he was sworn into the cabinet of Prime Minister Muhammad Yaqoob Khan as Minister for Revenue.

On 29 October 2009, he was sworn into the cabinet of Prime Minister Raja Farooq Haider Khan as Minister for Tourism, Sports, Culture, and Youth Affairs.

On 12 August 2010, he was sworn into the cabinet of Prime Minister Attique Ahmed Khan as Minister for Trade, Industries, and Animal Husbandry.

On 9 October 2010, an election tribunal declared him ineligible for possessing a fake educational certificate.

He attempted to contest the 2011 Azad Kashmiri general election from LA-4 Mirpur-IV, but his nomination papers were rejected by the constituency's returning officer. He later appealed this decision to the Chief Election Commissioner (CEC). The CEC dismissed his appeal as under the AJK Legislative Assembly (Election) Ordinance 1970, a person was disqualified if he did not possess a qualification of Matriculation or equivalent.

He was re-elected to the Assembly from LA-4 Mirpur-IV as a candidate of Pakistan Muslim League (N) (PML(N)) in the 2016 Azad Kashmiri general election.

On 8 September 2018, he was sworn into the cabinet of Prime Minister Raja Farooq Haider Khan as the Minister for Power Development Organization.

He contested the 2021 Azad Kashmiri general election from LA-4 Mirpur-IV as a candidate of PML(N), but was unsuccessful. He received 20,879 votes and was defeated by Chaudhry Arshad Hussain, a candidate of Pakistan Tehreek-e-Insaf (PTI).

He was re-elected to the Assembly from LA-4 Mirpur-IV as a candidate of PML(N) in the 2026 Azad Kashmiri general election. He received 22,376 votes, while the runner-up, Chaudhry Sohaib Arshad of the Pakistan People's Party (PPP), received 15,851 votes.

== 2026 sexual abuse allegations ==
In August 2026 The Guardian reported that he was arrested by Greater Manchester Police in July 2024 on suspicion of rape and trafficking involving allegations relating to child sexual abuse in Manchester during the 1990s. According to the report he was released on police bail pending further investigation and was reelected as Azad Jammu and Kashmir Legislative Assembly in 2026 while the investigation remained ongoing. The report stated that Ahmed had failed to answer bail in July 2026, reportedly citing ill health and that police were considering further legal action if he did not return to the UK. He did not respond to the newspaper's request for a comment.
