= Zobia Khurshid Raja =

Pakistani politician

- زوبیہ خورشید راجہ

Member of the Azad Kashmir Legislative Assembly
- Incumbent
- Assumed office 24 August 2026
- Constituency: Reserved seat for women

Personal details
- Party: Pakistan People's Party

Zobia Khurshid Raja (Urdu: زوبیہ خورشید راجہ) is a Pakistani politician who has been a member of the Azad Kashmir Legislative Assembly since August 2026.

== Political career ==
Zobia was elected to a reserved seat for women in the Azad Kashmir Legislative Assembly in the 2026 Azad Kashmiri general election as a candidate of the Pakistan People's Party (PPP).
