= LA-18 Poonch & Sudhnoti-I =

Electoral district in Azad Jammu and Kashmir

- Constituency for the Azad Kashmir Legislative Assembly
- District: Poonch District
- Electorate: 94,508

Current constituency
- Party: Pakistan Tehreek-e-Insaf
- Member: Abdul Qayyum Khan Niazi
- Created from: LA-17 Poonch & Sudhnoti-I

LA-18 Poonch & Sudhnoti-I is a constituency of the Azad Kashmir Legislative Assembly which is currently represented by the Abdul Qayyum Khan Niazi of the Pakistan Tehreek-e-Insaf (PTI). It covers the area of Abbaspur Tehsil in Poonch District.

== Election 2016 ==
General elections were held on 21 July 2016.

General election 2016: LA-17 Poonch & Sudhnoti-I
Party	Candidate	Votes	%	±%
PML(N)	Chaudhary Muhammad Yasin Gulshan	19,413		
AJKMC	Abdul Qayyum Khan Niazi	18,735		
PPP	Sardar Amjad Yousif Khan	6,812		
Independent	Sardar Safeer Alam Khan	1,623		
PTI	Sardar Muhammad Asghar Afandi	765		
Independent	Ahmad Rasheed Sagar	236		
Muttahida Kashmir Peoples National Party	Asad Nawaz	169		
Independent	Sardar Saleem Chugtai	167		
Independent	Altaf Maqbool Chaudhary	71		
Independent	Sardar Ikhlaq Ayub	54		
Independent	Sehrab Akbar	35		
Independent	Malik Abdul Hafeef	28		
Independent	Muhammad Ajmal Khan	20		
Independent	Sardar Abdur Raheem Khan	10		
Turnout		48,038		

== Election 2021 ==
General elections were held on 25 July 2021.

General election 2021: LA-18 Poonch & Sudhnoti-I
Party	Candidate	Votes	%	±%
PTI	Abdul Qayyum Khan Niazi	24,232	40.44	
PML(N)	Chaudhry Muhammad Yasin Gulshan	15,769	26.32	
PPP	Sardar Amjad Yousif Khan	11,635	19.42	
Independent	Muhammad Naseer Khan	2,336	3.90	
TLP	Tariq Aziz	2,210	3.69	
Others	Others (seventeen candidates)	3,739	6.24	
Turnout		59,921	63.40	
Majority		8,463	14.12	
Registered electors		94,508		
PTI gain from PML(N)				
