= Chaudhry Abdul Rehman Arain =

Pakistani politician

- چوہدری عبدالرحمان آرائیں

Member of the Azad Kashmir Legislative Assembly
- Incumbent
- Assumed office 24 August 2026
- Constituency: Reserved seat for overseas Kashmiris

Personal details
- Party: Pakistan Muslim League (N)

Chaudhry Abdul Rehman Arain (Urdu: چوہدری عبدالرحمان آرائیں) is a Pakistani politician who has been a member of the Azad Kashmir Legislative Assembly since August 2026.

== Political career ==
Arain was elected to the Azad Kashmir Legislative Assembly on a reserved seat for overseas Kashmiris in the 2026 Azad Kashmiri general election as a candidate of the Pakistan Muslim League (N) (PML(N)).

On 4 September 2026, he was sworn into the cabinet of Prime Minister Ifitikhar Gilani.
