= LA-32 Muzaffarabad-VI =

Constituency of the Azad Kashmir Legislative Assembly

- Constituency for the Azad Kashmir Legislative Assembly
- District: Hattian Bala District
- Electorate: 70,865

Current constituency
- Party: Pakistan Muslim League (N)
- Member: Farooq Haider Khan
- Created from: LA-28 Muzaffarabad-V

LA-32 Muzaffarabad-VI is a constituency of the Azad Kashmir Legislative Assembly which is currently represented by Farooq Haider Khan of the Pakistan Muslim League (N) (PML(N)). It covers the area of Chakar Tehsil in Hattian Bala District.

== Election 2016 ==
General elections were held in this constituency on 21 July 2016.

General election 2016: LA-28 Muzaffarabad-V
Party	Candidate	Votes	%	±%
PML(N)	Farooq Haider Khan	30,625		
PPP	Ishfaq Zafar	16,314		
PTI	Muhammad Ishaq Tahir	3,490		
AJKMC	Muhammad Arif Zahid	2,003		
Islamic Democratic Party	Muhamamd Sajid Rehman	1,311		
Independent	Syed Zeeshan Haidar Kazmi	780		
Independent	Parvaiz Ahmad Kiyani	390		
JUI (F)	Muhamamd Saiyab Khokhar	351		
Independent	Sheikh Muhammad Saleem	320		
Jammu Kashmir National Party	Khushhal Khan Mughal	302		
Independent	Shakeel Ahmad Kiyani	283		
APML	Syed Zahid Abbas Kazmi	57		
MWM	Syed Hasnain Kazmi	25		
Turnout		56,251		

== Election 2021 ==
General elections were held on 25 July 2021.

General election 2021: LA-32 Muzaffarabad-VI
Party	Candidate	Votes	%	±%
PML(N)	Farooq Haider Khan	15,598	32.31	
PPP	Muhammad Ashfaq Zaffar	15,204	31.49	
PTI	Syed Zeeshan Haider Kazmi	9,016	18.68	
AJKMC	Sardar Nadeem Tariq Niaz	4,027	8.34	
JI	Raja Muhammad Mushtaq Khan	2,340	4.85	
Others	Others (five candidates)	2,093	4.34	
Turnout		48,278	68.13	
Majority		394	0.82	
Registered electors		70,865		
PML(N) hold				

== Election 2026 ==
Elections were held on 2 August 2026. Raja Farooq Haider Khan won the election with 21,611 votes.

General election 2026: LA-32 Muzaffarabad-VI
Party	Candidate	Votes	%	±%
PML(N)	Raja Farooq Haider Khan	21,611	45.46	▲13.15
PPP	Muhammad Ashfaq Zaffar	19,274	40.54	▲9.05
JI	Raja Muhammad Mushtaq Khan	6,458	13.58	▲8.73
Others	Others	196	0.41	
Turnout		48,499	53.47	▼14.66
Total valid votes		47,539	98.02	
Rejected ballots		960	1.98	
Majority		2,337	4.92	
Registered electors		90,705		
PML(N) hold				
