= Maryam Idrees =

Pakistani politician

- مریم ادریس

Member of the Azad Kashmir Legislative Assembly
- Incumbent
- Assumed office 24 August 2026
- Constituency: Reserved seat for women

Personal details
- Party: Pakistan Muslim League (N)

Maryam Idrees (Urdu: مریم ادریس) is a Pakistani politician who has been a member of the Azad Kashmir Legislative Assembly since August 2026.

== Political career ==
Maryam was elected to a reserved seat for women in the Azad Kashmir Legislative Assembly in the 2026 Azad Kashmiri general election as a candidate of the Pakistan Muslim League (N) (PML(N)).
