= LA-2 Mirpur-II =

Electoral district in Azad Jammu and Kashmir

- Constituency for the Azad Kashmir Legislative Assembly
- District: Mirpur District
- Electorate: 84,985

Current constituency
- Party: Pakistan People's Party
- Member: Chaudhry Qasim Majeed

LA-2 Mirpur-II is a constituency of the Azad Kashmir Legislative Assembly which is currently represented by Chaudhry Qasim Majeed of the Pakistan People's Party (PPP). It covers the area of Chakswari in Mirpur District.

== Election 2016 ==
General elections were held on 21 July 2016.

General election 2016: LA-2 Mirpur-II
Party	Candidate	Votes	%	±%
PPP	Chaudhry Abdul Majid	12,143	38.21	
PML(N)	Muhammad Nazir	11,315	35.61	
PTI	Zafar Anwar	4,749	14.94	
Independent	Zulfiqar Ali	2,056	6.47	
Pakistan Tehreek-e-Insaf Nazariati	Abdul Rehman Chaudry	555	1.75	
JI	Saood Iqbal	386	1.21	
Independent	Mehboob Asghar	226	0.71	
Sunni Ittehad Council	Sikander Hayyar	115	0.36	
Independent	Muhammad Khalil	54	0.17	
Independent	Zulfiqar Ali	49	0.15	
Independent	Nadeem Hussain	47	0.15	
Independent	Muhammad Maroof	26	0.08	
Independent	Zahid ur Rehman	17	0.05	
Tehreek Nizam-e-Mustafa	Aftab Ahmed	16	0.05	
Independent	Chaudhry Qasim Majeed	16	0.05	
Independent	Shahid Anwar	8	0.03	
Turnout		31,778		

== Election 2021 ==
General elections were held on 25 July 2021.

General election 2021: LA-2 Mirpur-II
Party	Candidate	Votes	%	±%
PPP	Chaudhry Qasim Majeed	10,377	28.63	▼9.58
PTI	Zafar Anwar	9,110	25.13	▲10.19
PML(N)	Muhammad Nazir	5,384	14.85	▼20.76
Independent	Azeem Bakash Chaudhry	4,611	12.72	
TLP	Abu Al Hasnat	2,748	7.58	▲7.58
AJKMC	Zulfiqar Ali	1,961	5.41	▲5.41
Independent	Sohail Sarfaraz	1,659	4.58	
Others	Others (eleven candidates)	400	1.10	
Turnout		36,250	42.65	
Majority		1,267	3.50	
Registered electors		84,985		
PPP hold				

== Election 2026 ==
General elections were held on 27 July 2026. Chaudhry Qasim Majeed of Pakistan People's Party (PPP) won the election with 13,376 votes.

General election 2026: LA-2 Mirpur-II
Party	Candidate	Votes	%	±%
PPP	Chaudhry Qasim Majeed	13,378	45.82	▲17.19
PML(N)	Azeem Bakhsh Chaudhry	8,499	29.11	▲14.26
Independent	Zafar Anwar	4,815	16.49	
IPP	Muhammad Maroof	1,050	3.60	
Others	Others (twenty candidates)	1,454	4.98	
Turnout		30,709	30.84	▼11.81
Total valid votes		29,196	95.07	
Rejected ballots		1,513	4.93	
Majority		4,879	16.71	▲13.21
Registered electors		99,585		
PPP hold				
