= LA-23 Poonch & Sudhnoti-VI =

Constituency of the Azad Kashmir Legislative Assembly

- Provincial Assembly constituency for the Azad Kashmir Legislative Assembly
- District: Sudhanoti District
- Electorate: 107,511

Current constituency
- Party: Pakistan Tehreek-e-Insaf
- Member: Sardar Muhammad Hussain Khan

LA-23 Poonch & Sudhnoti-VI is a constituency of the Azad Kashmir Legislative Assembly which is currently represented by Sardar Muhammad Hussain Khan of the Pakistan Tehreek-e-Insaf (PTI). It covers the areas of Mang Tehsil and Pallandri Tehsil in Sudhanoti District.

== Election 2016 ==
General elections were held in this constituency on 21 July 2016.

General election 2016: LA-21 Pooch & Sudhnoti-V
Party	Candidate	Votes	%	±%
PML(N)	Doctor Muhammad Najeeb Naqi Khan	25,732		
JUI (F)	Moulana Saeed Yousif	23,191		
PPP	Sardar Muhammad Hussain	3,460		
PTI	Ateeq Sakhawat	1,678		
AJKMC	Sardar Altaf Hussain Khan	934		
Qaumi Ittehad Party	Israr Farooq	116		
Independent	Ejaz Ahmad	111		
Sunni Ittehad Council	Mukhtar Ahmad Shah	46		
Public Rights Party	Naseer Khan	38		
Independent	Muhammad Azhar Shah	18		
Independent	Sardar Gul Nawaz Khan	18		
Independent	Amjad Rafiq Khan	18		
Independent	Muhammad Rais Khan	16		
Jammu and Kashmir National Party	Iftikhar Hussain	10		
Independent	Hamid Masood	5		
Independent	Nassem Ahmed Khan	4		
Turnout		55,395		

== Election 2021 ==
General elections were held on 25 July 2021.

General election 2021: LA-23 Pooch & Sudhnoti-VI
Party	Candidate	Votes	%	±%
PTI	Sardar Muhammad Hussain Khan	22,519	32.85	
PML(N)	Muhammad Najeeb Naqi Khan	19,575	28.55	
Independent	Moulana Saeed Yousaf Khan	15,570	22.71	
Independent	Malik Kabir Hussain	3,540	5.16	
PPP	Muhammad Raees Khan	2,701	3.94	
TLP	Naseem Ahmed Khan	1,394	2.03	
Independent	Junaid Altaf	1,134	1.65	
Others	Others (twelve candidates)	2,128	3.10	
Turnout		68,561	63.77	
Majority		2,944	4.29	
Registered electors		107,511		
PTI gain from PML(N)				
