= Chaudhry Tariq Farooq =

Pakistani politician

- چوہدری طارق فاروق

President of Azad Kashmir
- Acting
- In office 25 August 2026 – 24 September 2026
- Prime Minister: Faisal Mumtaz Rathore; Iftikhar Gilani
- Preceded by: Chaudhry Latif Akbar (acting)
- Succeeded by: Muhammad Najeeb Naqi Khan

Speaker of the Azad Kashmir Legislative Assembly
- Incumbent
- Assumed office 25 August 2026
- Deputy: Muhammad Ahmed Raza Qadri
- Preceded by: Chaudhry Latif Akbar

Member of the Azad Kashmir Legislative Assembly
- Incumbent
- Assumed office 24 August 2026
- Preceded by: Chaudhry Anwarul Haq
- Constituency: LA-7 Bhimber-III
- In office 25 July 2011 – 3 August 2021
- Preceded by: Chaudhry Anwarul Haq
- Succeeded by: Chaudhry Anwarul Haq
- Constituency: LA-7 Bhimber-III

Personal details
- Party: Pakistan Muslim League (N) (PML-N)

Chaudhry Tariq Farooq (Urdu: چوہدری طارق فاروق) is a Pakistani politician who has been the Speaker of the Azad Kashmir Legislative Assembly and Acting President of Azad Kashmir since August 2026. He has also been a member of the Assembly since August 2026. He previously served as a member of the Assembly from July 2011 to August 2021.

== Political career ==
Farooq was elected to the Azad Kashmir Legislative Assembly from LA-7 Bhimber-III as a candidate of All Jammu and Kashmir Muslim Conference (AJKMC) in the 2001 Azad Kashmiri general election.

On 24 November 2004, Farooq was sworn into the cabinet of Prime Minister Sikandar Hayat Khan. He served as the Minister for Public Works and Development Authorities.

He contested the 2006 Azad Kashmiri general election from LA-7 Bhimber-III as a candidate of AJKMC, but was unsuccessful. He was defeated by Chaudhry Anwarul Haq, a candidate of People's Muslim League.

On 7 August 2006, he was sworn into the cabinet of Prime Minister Attique Ahmed Khan. He served as an Advisor. After a cabinet re-shuffle, he was made an Advisor for Planning and Development. On 12 December 2008, he was once gain sworn into the cabinet as an Advisor after Prime Minister Khan had dissolved the old cabinet.

He was re-elected to the Azad Kashmir Legislative Assembly from LA-7 Bhimber-III as a candidate of Pakistan Muslim League (N) (PML(N)) in the 2011 Azad Kashmiri general election. He defeated Chaudhry Anwarul Haq, a candidate of Pakistan People's Party (PPP).

He was re-elected to the Assembly from LA-7 Bhimber-III as a candidate of PML(N) in the 2016 Azad Kashmiri general election. He received 30,339 votes and defeated Chaudhry Anwarul Haq, an independent candidate.

On 6 August 2016, he was sworn into the cabinet of Prime Minister Raja Farooq Haider Khan. He served as the Minister for Physical Planning and Housing, Agriculture, and Livestock. After a cabinet reshuffle, he was stripped of the Agriculture and Livestock portfolios.

He contested the 2021 Azad Kashmiri general election from LA-7 Bhimber-III as a candidate of PML(N), but was unsuccessful. He was defeated by Chaudhry Anwarul Haq, a candidate of Pakistan Tehreek-e-Insaf (PTI).

He was re-elected to the Assembly from LA-7 Bhimber-III as a candidate of PML(N) in the 2026 Azad Kashmiri general election. He received 37,613 votes, while the runner-up, independent candidate Chaudhry Anwarul Haq, received 25,534 votes.

After taking oath as a member of the Assembly on 24 August 2026, he was elected as Speaker of the Assembly the following day. He received 32 votes and defeated Chaudhry Qasim Majeed of PPP. Since the office of President was vacant at the time of his election to the speakership, he also automatically became the Acting President.
