= Muhammad Ahmed Raza Qadri =

Pakistani politician

- محمد احمد رضا قادری

Deputy Speaker of the Azad Kashmir Legislative Assembly
- Incumbent
- Assumed office 25 August 2026
- Speaker: Chaudhry Tariq Farooq
- Preceded by: Riaz Gujjar

Member of the Azad Kashmir Legislative Assembly
- Incumbent
- Assumed office 30 July 2016
- Preceded by: Abdul Salam Butt
- Constituency: LA-44 Kashmir Valley-V (2021-present); LA-40 Kashmir Valley-V (2016-2021)
- In office 2010 – 25 July 2011
- Preceded by: Sanaullah Qadri
- Succeeded by: Abdul Salam Butt
- Constituency: LA-40 Kashmir Valley-V

Personal details
- Party: Pakistan Muslim League (N) (2011-present)
- Other political affiliations: All Jammu and Kashmir Muslim Conference (-2011)

Muhammad Ahmed Raza Qadri (Urdu: محمد احمد رضا قادری) is a Pakistani politician who has been the Deputy Speaker of the Azad Kashmir Legislative Assembly from August 2026. He has also been a member of the Assembly since July 2016. He previously served in this role from February 2010 to July 2011.

== Political career ==
Qadri was elected to the Azad Kashmir Legislative Assembly from LA-40 Kashmir Valley-V as a candidate of All Jammu and Kashmir Muslim Conference (AJKMC) in a February 2010 by-election, which was held due to the death of Sanaullah Qadri, his father. He received 2,158 votes and defeated Abdul Salam Butt, a candidate of Pakistan People's Party (PPP).

On 12 August 2010, he was sworn into the cabinet of Prime Minister Attique Ahmed Khan, and was made the Minister for Transport, Sports and Youth Affairs.

On 14 May 2011, he resigned from the cabinet and joined Pakistan Muslim League (N) (PML(N)).

He was re-elected to the Assembly from LA-40 Kashmir Valley-V as a candidate of PML(N) in the 2016 Azad Kashmiri general election. He received 2,085 votes and defeated Meher-un-Nisa, a candidate of AJKMC.

On 14 April 2018, he was sworn into the cabinet of Prime Minister Raja Farooq Haider Khan, and was made the Minister for State Disaster Management Authority. After cabinet reshuffle on 7 November 2018, he was also made the Minister for Civil Defence.

He was re-elected to the Assembly from LA-44 Kashmir Valley-V as a candidate of the PML(N) in the 2021 Azad Kashmiri general election. He received 2,007 votes and defeated Meher-un-Nisa, a candidate of AJKMC.

He was re-elected to the Assembly from LA-44 Kashmir Valley-V as a candidate of the PML(N) in the 2026 Azad Kashmiri general election. He received 2,308 votes, while the runner-up, Meher-un-Nisa of the AJKMC, received 650 votes.

After taking oath as a member of the Assembly on 24 August 2026, he was elected to the position of Deputy Speaker the following day. He received 32 votes and defeated Amir Abdul Ghaffar Lone of Pakistan People's Party (PPP).
