= LA-19 Poonch & Sudhnoti-II =

Electoral district in Azad Jammu and Kashmir

- Constituency for the Azad Kashmir Legislative Assembly
- District: Poonch District
- Electorate: 85,778

Current constituency
- Party: Pakistan Muslim League (N)
- Member: Sardar Aamir Altaf Khan
- Created from: LA-18 Poonch & Sudhnoti-II

LA-19 Poonch & Sudhnoti-II is a constituency of the Azad Kashmir Legislative Assembly which is currently represented by Sardar Aamir Altaf Khan of the Pakistan Muslim League (N) (PML(N)). It covers the area of Hajira Tehsil in Poonch District.

== Election 2016 ==
General elections were held on 21 July 2016.

General election 2016: LA-18 Poonch & Sudhnoti-II
Party	Candidate	Votes	%	±%
PML(N)	Sardar Khan Bahadur Khan	23,668		
PPP	Sardar Ghulam Sadiq Khan	16,102		
AJKMC	Sardar Kashan Masood Khan	4,965		
PTI	Sardar Abdul Hameed Khan	718		
JUI (F)	Muhammad Zahid Khan	650		
JI	Muhammad Haleem Khan	621		
Independent	Afraiz Ahmad Shaheen	338		
Sunni Ittehad Council	Muhammad Umar Khan	307		
National Democratic Alliance	Azhar Ahmad Khan	273		
Muttahida Kashmir Peoples National Party	Muhammad Rizwan Khan Kashmiri	21		
Turnout		47,663		

== By-election 2018 ==
A by-election was held on 21 October 2018 due to the death of Sardar Khan Bahadur Khan, the previous MLA from this seat.

By-election 2018: LA-19 Poonch & Sudhnoti-II
Party	Candidate	Votes	%	±%
PML(N)	Sardar Aamir Altaf Khan	20,688	47.03	
PPP	Sardar Ghulam Sadiq Khan	14,613	33.22	
AJKMC	Sardar Kashan Masood	3,188	7.25	
PTI	Sardar Muhammad Sawar Khan	3,119	7.09	
JKPP	Sardar Nizam Khan	1,331	3.03	
Others	Others (four candidates)	1,053	2.39	
Turnout		43,992		
Majority		6,075	13.81	
PML(N) hold				

== Election 2021 ==
General elections were held on 25 July 2021.

General election 2021: LA-19 Poonch & Sudhnoti-II
Party	Candidate	Votes	%	±%
PML(N)	Sardar Aamir Altaf Khan	13,413	25.69	▼21.34
PPP	Saood bin Sadiq	12,517	23.97	▼9.25
PTI	Sardar Arzash Sadozai	9,126	17.48	▲10.39
Independent	Kamran Bashir	8,839	16.93	
Others	Others (twelve candidates)	8,326	15.94	
Turnout		52,221	60.88	
Majority		896	1.72	▼12.09
Registered electors		85,778		
PML(N) hold				
