= Fatehpur, Azad Kashmir =

Fatehpur Thakiala
- Location within Azad Kashmir
- Coordinates: 33.38°N 73.58°E
- Country: Pakistan
- Province: Azad Kashmir
- Time zone: UTC+5 (PST)

Fatehpur Thakiala (Urdu: فتحپور تھکیالہ نکیال, romanized: Thakiala Prawa) is a town in Fatehpur Thakiala, Kotli District, in the Azad Kashmir, Pakistan. Thakiala was a part of tehsil Mahnder before independence in 1947. It is located at 33°29'16.0"N 74°06'09.0"E. It is 40 kilometres from Kotli city and 181 kilometres from Islamabad. Due to high altitude (1524 meters) Fatehpur Thakiala is comparatively a colder place than the rest of the district.
