= LA-22 Poonch & Sudhnoti-V =

Constituency of the Azad Kashmir Legislative Assembly

- Constituency for the Azad Kashmir Legislative Assembly
- District: Poonch District
- Electorate: 84,676

Current constituency
- Party: Pakistan Tehreek-e-Insaf
- Member: Shahida Saghir
- Created from: LA-20 Poonch & Sudhnoti-IV

LA-22 Poonch & Sudhnoti-V is a constituency of the Azad Kashmir Legislative Assembly which is currently represented by Shahida Saghir of the Pakistan Tehreek-e-Insaf (PTI). It covers the area of Thorar Tehsil in Poonch District.

== Election 2016 ==
General elections were held on 21 July 2016.

General election 2016: LA-20 Poonch & Sudhnoti-IV
Party	Candidate	Votes	%	±%
AJKMC	Sardar Muhammad Sagheer Chugtai	17,467		
JKPP	Sardar Mehmood Iqbal	15,978		
PPP	Begum Shamshad Aziz	1,618		
Independent	Sajid Mehmood	989		
Independent	Sardar Shaukat Mehmood Khan	569		
Independent	Syed Habib Hussain Shah Advocate	312		
JUI (F)	Basharat Ahmad Naveed	305		
Independent	Sardar Abdul Qadeer Khan	133		
Sunni Ittehad Council	Muhammad Zubair Qadri	129		
Independent	Sardar Seiyab Khalid Advocate	67		
Independent	Sardar Abid Rasheed	33		
Independent	Azkar Ahmed	0		
Independent	Muhammad Asadullah Khan	0		
Turnout		37,600		

== Election 2021 ==
General elections were held on 25 July 2021.

General election 2021: LA-22 Poonch & Sudhnoti-V
Party	Candidate	Votes	%	±%
PTI	Shahida Saghir	16,962	38.11	
JKPP	Asad Ibrahim Khan	10,582	23.77	
PML(N)	Sardar Abdul Khaliq Wasi	7,064	15.87	
AJKMC	Tahir Akram Khan	3,364	7.56	
Independent	Sajid Mehmood	1,516	3.41	
JI	Muhammad Sajjad Khan	1,389	3.12	
Independent	Manzoor Ahmed Kiani	1,229	2.76	
Others	Others (ten candidates)	2,405	5.40	
Turnout		44,511	52.57	
Majority		6,380	14.33	
Registered electors		84,676		
PTI gain from AJKMC				
