= LA-20 Poonch & Sudhnoti-III =

Electoral district in Azad Jammu and Kashmir

- Constituency for the Azad Kashmir Legislative Assembly
- District: Poonch District
- Electorate: 64,099

Current constituency
- Party: Pakistan People's Party
- Member: Sardar Muhammad Yaqoob Khan
- Created from: LA-19 Poonch & Sudhnoti-III

LA-20 Poonch & Sudhnoti-III is a constituency of the Azad Kashmir Legislative Assembly which is currently represented by Sardar Muhammad Yaqoob Khan of the Pakistan People's Party (PPP). It covers half of the area of Rawalakot Tehsil in Poonch District.

== Election 2021 ==
General election were held on 25 July 2021

General election 2021: LA-20 Poonch & Sudhnoti-III
Party	Candidate	Votes	%	±%
PPP	Sardar Muhammad Yaqoob Khan	11,925	32.98	
PML(N)	Abdul Rasheed Khan	4,883	13.50	
Tehreek e Jawanan e Pakistan	Irfan Ashraf	4,860	13.44	
PTI	Khattab Azam Khan	4,191	11.59	
JI	Zahid Rafiq Khan	3,214	8.89	
JKPP	Sardar Javid Hussain	2,999	8.29	
Independent	Liaqat Hayat	1,161	3.21	
TLP	Shafat Hussain	1,036	2.86	
Others	Others (nine candidates)	1,893	5.23	
Turnout		36,162	56.42	
Majority		7,042	19.47	
Registered electors		64,099		
PPP win (new seat)				
