= Faisal Mumtaz Rathore =

Azad Kashmiri politician (born 1978)

- فیصل ممتاز راٹھور

16th Prime Minister of Azad Kashmir
- In office 17 November 2025 – 28 August 2026
- President: Sultan Mehmood Chaudhry; Chaudhry Latif Akbar (Acting); Chaudhry Tariq Farooq (Acting)
- Preceded by: Chaudhry Anwarul Haq
- Succeeded by: Iftikhar Gilani

Minister for Local Government and Rural Development
- In office 20 April 2023 – 17 November 2025
- Prime Minister: Chaudhry Anwarul Haq
- Preceded by: Khawaja Farooq Ahmed

Minister for Electricity and Azad Kashmir Logging and Sawmills Corporation
- In office 2 August 2011 – 29 July 2016
- Prime Minister: Chaudhry Abdul Majid
- Preceded by: Mirza Shafique Jarral (Electricity); Abdul Majid Khan (Azad Kashmir Logging and Sawmills Corporation)
- Succeeded by: Raja Nisar Ahmed Khan (Electricity); Raja Wajid-ur-Rehman (Azad Kashmir Logging and Sawmills Corporation)

Member of the Azad Jammu and Kashmir Legislative Assembly
- Incumbent
- Assumed office 3 August 2021
- Constituency: LA-17 Bagh-IV
- In office 25 July 2011 – 30 July 2016
- Constituency: LA-16 Bagh-IV

Personal details
- Born: 11 April 1978 (age 48) Rawalpindi, Punjab, Pakistan
- Citizenship: Pakistan
- Party: PPP (2006–present)
- Parent: Raja Mumtaz Hussain Rathore
- Profession: Politician; Host

Raja Faisal Mumtaz Rathore (born 11 April 1978) is an Azad Kashmiri politician who is the former Prime Minister of Azad Kashmir, he served in this office from 17 November 2025 until 28 August 2026. He is a senior member of the Pakistan People's Party (PPP) and has previously held several ministerial positions in the AJK government.

== Early life and family ==
Raja Faisal Mumtaz Rathore was born on 11 April 1978 in Rawalpindi. At the time, his father, Raja Mumtaz Hussain Rathore, was serving as a minister in the government of Azad Kashmir, and his mother, Begum Farhat Rathore, was serving as a member of the Azad Kashmir Legislative Assembly. He received his early education in Rawalpindi and completed his graduation from the University of the Punjab. His father later served as the Prime Minister of Azad Kashmir from 1990 to 1991, the Leader of the Opposition from 1991 to 1996, the Speaker of the Legislative Assembly from 1996 to 1998, and then again as the Leader of the Opposition from 1998 till his death in 1999. After the elder Rathore's death, Masood Mumtaz Rathore, his son and Faisal Rathore's elder brother, was elected to the Assembly to serve the remainder of his term.

== Political career ==
Rathore contested his first elections from LA-16 Bagh-IV as a candidate of Pakistan People's Party (PPP) in the 2006 Azad Kashmiri general election, but was unsuccessful. He was defeated by Chaudhry Muhammad Aziz, an independent candidate.

He was elected to the Azad Kashmir Legislative Assembly from LA-16 Bagh-IV as a candidate of PPP in the 2011 Azad Kashmiri general election. He received 32,786 votes and defeated Chaudhry Muhammad Aziz, a candidate of the All Jammu and Kashmir Muslim Conference (AJKMC). He later served as the Minister for Logging and Sawmills Corporation and Minister for Electricity and in the cabinet of Prime Minister Chaudhry Abdul Majid.

On 23 March 2017, he was appointed as the General Secretary of the PPP's Azad Kashmir chapter.

He was re-elected to the Legislative Assembly from LA-17 Bagh-IV as a candidate of PPP in the 2021 Azad Kashmiri general election. He received 30,085 votes and defeated Chaudhry Muhammad Aziz, a candidate of Pakistan Muslim League (N) (PML(N)).

After the election, he was nominated by PPP to the position of Speaker of the Assembly, but he was unsuccessful. He received 15 votes and was defeated by Chaudhry Anwarul Haq of Pakistan Tehreek-e-Insaf (PTI).

He was appointed to the cabinet of Prime Minister Chaudhry Anwarul Haq on 20 April 2023. He was assigned the portfolios of Local Government and Rural Development.

On 17 November 2025, he was elected as the Prime Minister of Azad Kashmir, securing 36 votes in the Legislative Assembly following a no-confidence motion supported by PPP and the PML(N). On 18 November, he was administered the oath of office by Chaudhry Latif Akbar, the Speaker of the Azad Kashmir Legislative Assembly.

He was re-elected to the Assembly from LA-17 Bagh-IV as a candidate of PPP in the 2026 Azad Kashmiri general election. He received 33,872 votes and defeated Chaudhry Mohsin Aziz, a candidate of PML(N).

== Media career ==
In addition to his career in politics, Rathore has worked in the national media as the host of a regular program on a private television channel.
