= Abdul Qayyum Khan Niazi =

Pakistani politician

- سردار عبدالقیوم خان نیازی

13th Prime Minister of Azad Kashmir
- In office 4 August 2021 – 14 April 2022
- President: Masood Khan; Sultan Mehmood Chaudhry
- Preceded by: Farooq Haider Khan
- Succeeded by: Tanveer Ilyas Khan

Member of the Azad Jammu and Kashmir Legislative Assembly
- In office 3 August 2021 – 25 August 2026
- Preceded by: Chaudhry Muhammad Yasin Gulshan
- Constituency: LA-18 Poonch & Sudhnoti-I
- In office 2006–2011
- Preceded by: Chaudhry Muhammad Yasin Gulshan
- Succeeded by: Chaudhry Muhammad Yasin Gulshan
- Constituency: LA-17 Poonch & Sudhnoti-I

President of PTI Azad Kashmir
- Incumbent
- Assumed office 24 April 2023
- Chairman: Imran Khan; Gohar Ali Khan
- Preceded by: Tanveer Ilyas Khan

Minister for Food Government of Azad Kashmir
- In office 2006–2008

Minister for Forest Government of Azad Kashmir
- In office 2010–2011

Personal details
- Born: 1959 (age 66–67) Dara Sher Khan, Azad Kashmir
- Party: PTI (2019-present)
- Other political affiliations: AJKMC (2006-2019)

Sardar Abdul Qayyum Khan Niazi (Urdu: سردار عبدالقیوم خان نیازی) is a Kashmiri politician from Azad Jammu and Kashmir who was the 13th Prime Minister of Azad Kashmir from August 2021 to April 2022. He has been a member of the Azad Jammu and Kashmir Legislative assembly since August 2021. He has been the president of Pakistan Tehreek-e-Insaf's Azad Jammu and Kashmir chapter since April 2023.

== Personal life ==
Niazi was born in Darra Sher Khan, a village in the Poonch District of Azad Kashmir, being one of the 8 children of Fazal Dad, a councilor from Poonch, and they belong to the Dulli tribe of Poonch, Niazi not being indicative of some Pashtun ancestry but instead a title he chose in the '90s when he was a member of the district council, as his name was regularly confused with that of Sardar Abdul Qayyum Khan, who served as the President and the PM of AJK in the past.

His elder brother, Haji Ghulam Mustafa, has also been a minister while his younger brother, Sardar Habib Zia, is a lawyer and his son a councilor in the United Kingdom.

== Political career ==
Graduating from the Azad Kashmir University, and beginning his political career in 1982 as district councilor in Poonch, he and his family have been traditionally associated with the All Jammu and Kashmir Muslim Conference (AJKMC) party.

Niazi became a member of the AJK Legislative Assembly on an AJKMC ticket in 2006 and held from 2006 to 2011 different ministerial portfolios in prison, finances and others.

Besides serving in the district council, Niazi remained the minister for food security between 2006 and 2008 in the Muslim Conference government, and the forest minister in the second cabinet of Sardar Ateeq from 2010 to 2011.

Niazi was re-elected to the Legislative Assembly on a ticket of the Pakistan Tehreek-e-Insaf (PTI) in the 2021 elections from LA-18 Poonch-III. After taking oath as a member, he received 33 votes in the Assembly, a majority, to become the 13th Prime Minister of Azad Jammu and Kashmir. On 14 April 2022, Niazi tendered his resignation as Prime Minister after a move by his parliamentary party, the PTI, to replace him with regional president Sardar Tanveer Ilyas through a vote of no-confidence.
