= 2021 Azad Kashmiri general election =

2021 Azad Kashmir general election
- 25 July 2021

All 53 seats in the Azad Kashmir Legislative Assembly 27 seats needed for a majority
- Registered: 3,220,793
- Turnout: 61.30% (▼0.90%)

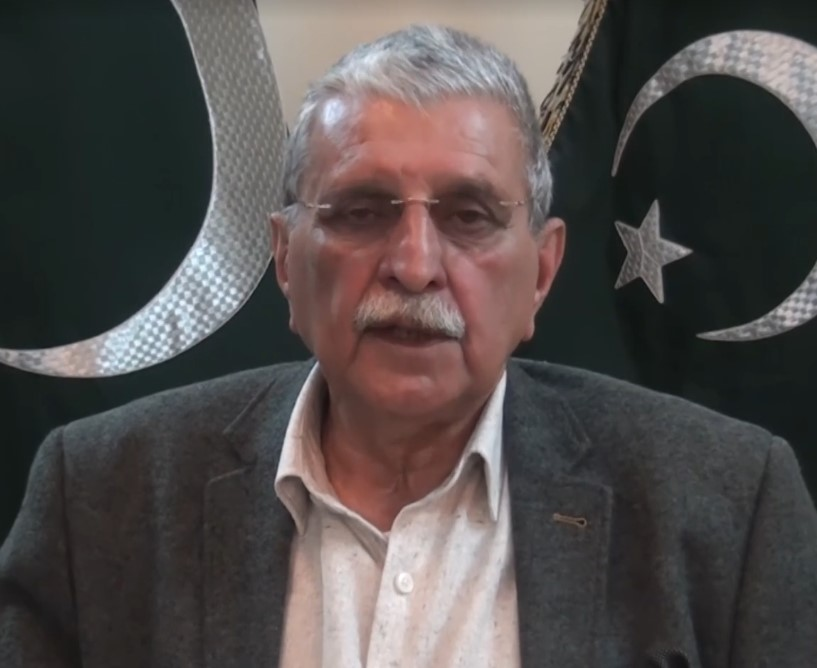

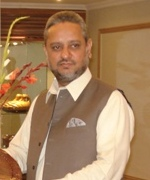

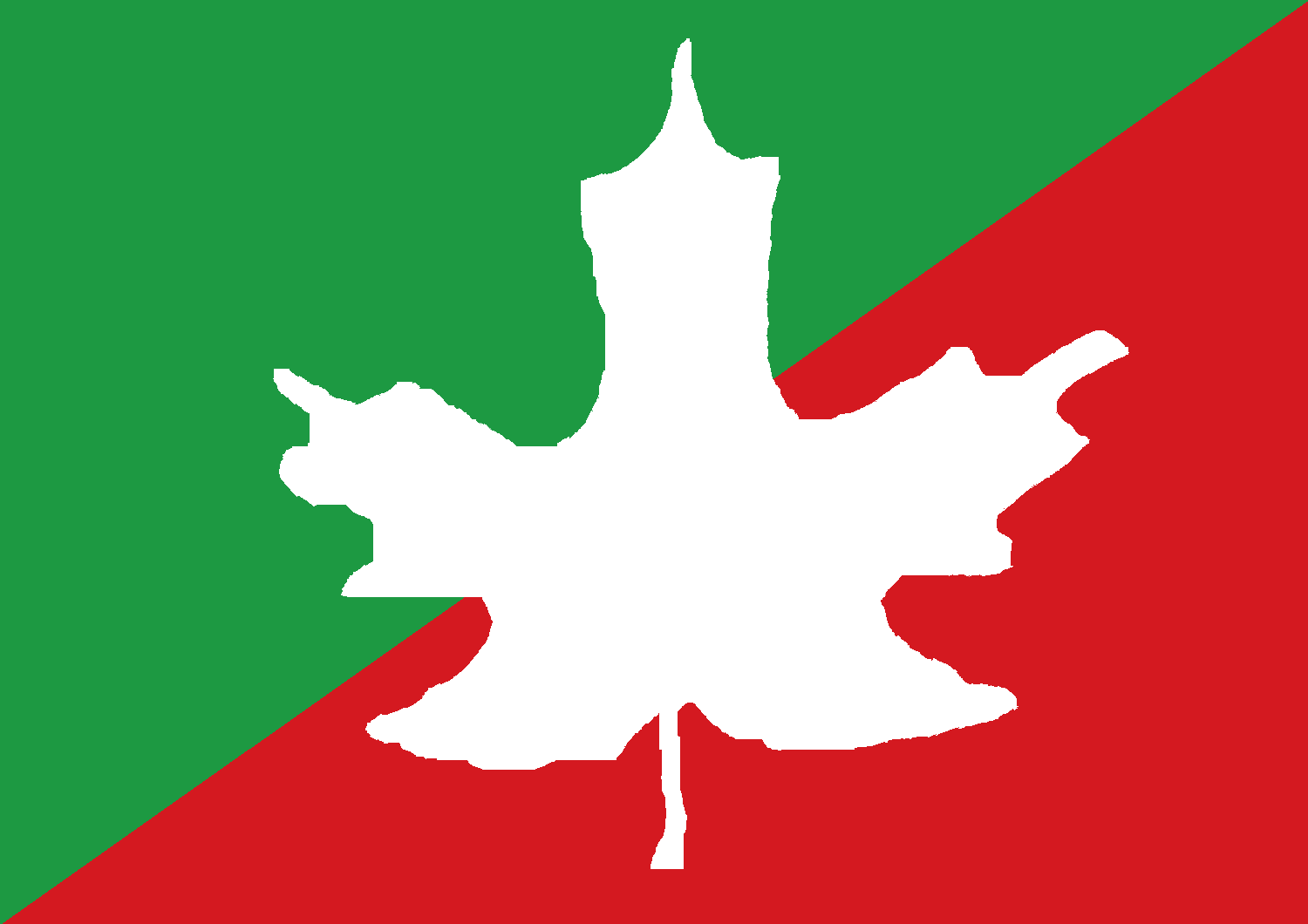
	First party	Second party	Third party
Leader	Abdul Qayyum Khan Niazi	Chaudhry Latif Akbar	Raja Farooq Haider Khan
Party	PTI	PPP	PML(N)
Leader's seat	Poonch & Sudhnoti-I	Muzaffarabad-V	Muzaffarabad-VI; Muzaffarabad-VII (lost)
Last election	2 seats, 12.7%	4 seats, 21.2%	36 seats, 44.4%
Seats won	32	12	7
Seat change	▲30	▲8	▼29
Popular vote	613,590	349,895	491,091
Percentage	31.4%	17.9%	25.1%
Swing	▲18.7pp	▼3.3pp	▼19.3pp
	Fourth party	Fifth party
Leader	Attique Ahmed Khan	Hassan Ibrahim Khan
Party	AJKMC	JKPP
Leader's seat	Bagh-I	Poonch & Sudhnoti-IV
Last election	3 seats, 10.3%	1 seat, 2.5%
Seats won	1	1
Seat change	▼2	Steady
Popular vote	153,861	119,048
Percentage	7.9%	6.1%
Swing	▼2.4pp	▲3.6pp
- Map of Azad Kashmir showing Assembly Constituencies
Prime Minister before election
Raja Farooq Haider
PML(N)
Elected Prime Minister
Abdul Qayyum Khan Niazi
PTI

General elections were held in Azad Kashmir on 25 July 2021 after the expiry of the 5-year term of the previous Legislative Assembly. The elections were held in 33 constituencies of Azad Kashmir and 12 constituencies of the refugees of Jammu and Kashmir in Pakistan.

By an early estimate, over 2.82 million people of Azad Kashmir were registered to vote; of which 1.59 million were male voters, while 1.30 million were female voters. By the time of the election, the number of registered voters had increased to 3,220,793.

A total of 724 candidates stood for 45 general seats this year. 579 candidates competed for the 33 constituencies within Azad Kashmir, while the remaining 145 competed for the 12 refugee constituencies in Pakistan.

== Background ==
In current elections The PTI won 26, the PPP 11 and PML N 6. In addition, AJ&K MC won 1 seats, JK PPP 1 seat.

Following these results, Pakistan Tehreek e Insaf was able to form a comfortable majority government, controlling 26 general seats and 6 reserved/technocrat seats, giving them 32 out of the 53 seats in the assembly.

== Addition of new seats ==
4 new seats were added in Azad Kashmir Legislative Assembly. Muzaffarabad, Neelum, Sudhanoti/Poonch and Kotli districts gained an additional seats each, hence, the number of members in the Assembly of Azad Kashmir was elevated from 49 to 53. Therefore the new amount of seats needed for a majority became 27.

== Results ==
32	12	7	1	1
PTI	PPP	PML(N)	AJKMC	JKPP

Vote Share of different parties in the election.
1. PTI (31.4%)
2. PML-N (25.1%)
3. PPP (17.9%)
4. AJKMC (7.86%)
5. JKPP (6.08%)
6. TLP (4.94%)
7. IND (6.80%)
Seat Share of different parties in the election.
1. PTI (60.4%)
2. PPP (22.6%)
3. PML-N (13.2%)
4. AJKMC (1.89%)
5. JKPP (1.89%)

The polls were open across Azad Kashmir and Pakistan from 8:00 to 17:00 PST. The results of started to pour in after poll closings in the evening. The below table shows election results by political party.

Party	Votes	%	Seats				
Party	Votes	%	General	Women	Ulema Technocrat and Overseas	Total	Change ▲ ▼
Pakistan Tehreek-e-Insaf	613,590	31.35	26	3	3	32	▲30
Pakistan Peoples Party	349,895	17.88	11	1	0	12	▲9
Pakistan Muslim League (N)	491,091	25.09	6	1	0	7	▼24
All Jammu and Kashmir Muslim Conference	153,861	7.86	1	0	0	1	▼2
Jammu Kashmir Peoples Party	119,048	6.08	1	0	0	1	▲1
Tehreek-e-Labbaik Pakistan	96,697	4.94	0	0	0	0	Steady
Independents	133,136	6.80	0	0	0	0	Steady
Total	1,957,318	100.00	45	5	3	53	▲4
Valid votes	1,957,318	99.14					
Invalid/blank votes	17,000	0.86					
Total votes	1,974,318	100.00					
Registered voters/turnout	3,220,793	61.30					
Source: EC-AJK (Party Positions), (everything else)

=== By constituency ===
Constituency		Winner				Runner-up				Margin	Registered Voters	Votes Cast	Voter Turnout
District	Name	Candidate	Party	Votes	%	Candidate	Party	Votes	%	Margin	Registered Voters	Votes Cast	Voter Turnout
Mirpur	LA-1	Chaudhry Azhar Sadiq	PTI	14,233	37.08%	Chaudhry Masood Khalid	PML(N)	7,609	19.82%	6,624	93,480	38,386	41.06%
Mirpur	LA-2	Chaudhry Qasim Majeed	PPP	10,377	28.63%	Zafar Anwar	PTI	9,110	25.13%	1,267	84,985	36,250	42.65%
Mirpur	LA-3	Sultan Mehmood Chaudhry	PTI	18,703	43.51%	Muhammad Saeed	PML(N)	15,556	36.19%	3,147	85,917	42,985	50.03%
Mirpur	LA-4	Chaudhry Arshad Hussain	PTI	22,768	44.66%	Chaudhry Rukhsar Ahmed	PML(N)	20,984	41.16%	1,784	87,040	50,984	58.58%
Bhimber	LA-5	Waqar Ahmed Noor	PML(N)	21,799	36.54%	Pervaiz Ashraf	PPP	15,583	26.12%	6,216	82,620	59,666	72.22%
Bhimber	LA-6	Chaudhry Ali Shan Soni	PTI	24,946	39.80%	Chaudhry Muhammad Razzaq	IND	16,640	26.55%	8,306	92,888	62,681	67.48%
Bhimber	LA-7	Chaudhry Anwarul Haq	PTI	38,303	49.13%	Chaudhry Tariq Farooq	PML(N)	32,245	41.36%	6,058	112,029	77,967	69.60
Kotli	LA-8	Zafar Iqbal Malik	PTI	17,299	36.53%	Malik Muhammad Nawaz Khan	AJKMC	12,107	25.57%	5,192	73,121	47,351	64.76%
Kotli	LA-9	Chaudhry Javed Iqbal Budhanvi	PPP	24,276	43.35%	Sardar Muhammad Naeem Khan	AJKMC	19,484	34.79%	4,792	84,622	56,000	66.18%
Kotli	LA-10	Chaudhry Muhammad Yasin	PPP	9,696	21.70%	Malik Muhammad Yousaf	PTI	9,507	21.28%	189	70,533	44,674	63.34%
Kotli	LA-11	Chaudhry Muhammad Ikhlaq	PTI	25,201	36.75%	Raja Muhammad Naseer	PML(N)	24,288	35.42%	913	105,827	68,581	64.80%
Kotli	LA-12	Chaudhry Muhammad Yasin	PPP	21,527	31.71%	Raja Muhammad Riasat Khan	PML(N)	20,081	29.58%	1,446	106,428	67,880	63.78%
Kotli	LA-13	Nisar Ansar	PTI	23,340	37.53%	Muhammad Waleed	PPP	17,554	28.22%	5,786	96,220	62,194	64.64%
Bagh	LA-14	Attique Ahmed Khan	AJKMC	25,389	37.65%	Muhammad Latif Khalique	PTI	17,056	25.29%	8,333	102,491	67,437	65.80%
Bagh	LA-15	Sardar Tanveer Ilyas	PTI	19,825	34.03%	Sardar Ziaul Qamar	PPP	14,558	24.99%	5,267	96,561	58,257	60.33%
Bagh	LA-16	Mir Akbar Khan	PTI	23,563	41.46%	Sardar Qamar uz Zaman Khan	PPP	23,267	40.94%	296	87,814	56,828	64.71%
Bagh	LA-17	Faisal Mumtaz Rathore	PPP	30,085	41.96%	Chaudhry Muhammad Aziz	PML(N)	25,421	35.45%	4,664	97,902	71,035	72.56%
Poonch	LA-18	Abdul Qayyum Khan Niazi	PTI	24,232	40.44%	Chaudhry Muhammad Yasin Gulshan	PML(N)	15,769	26.32%	8,463	94,508	59,921	63.40%
Poonch	LA-19	Sardar Aamir Altaf Khan	PML(N)	13,413	25.69%	Saood bin Sadiq	PPP	12,517	23.97%	896	85,778	52,221	60.88%
Poonch	LA-20	Sardar Muhammad Yaqoob Khan	PPP	11,925	32.98%	Abdul Rasheed Khan	PML(N)	4,883	13.50%	7,042	64,099	36,162	56.42%
Poonch	LA-21	Hassan Ibrahim Khan	JKPP	8,190	23.46%	Tahir Anwar Khan	PML(N)	6,198	17.75%	1,992	88,220	34,915	39.58%
Poonch	LA-22	Shahida Saghir	PTI	16,962	38.11%	Asad Ibrahim Khan	JKPP	10,582	23.77%	6,380	84,676	44,511	52.57%
Sudhnoti	LA-23	Sardar Muhammad Hussain Khan	PTI	22,519	32.85%	Muhammad Najeeb Naqi Khan	PML(N)	19,575	28.55%	2,944	107,511	68,561	63.77%
Sudhnoti	LA-24	Sardar Faheem Akhtar	PTI	30,727	47.26%	Sardar Farooq Ahmed Tahir	PML(N)	24,363	37.40%	6,404	98,539	65,147	66.11%
Neelum	LA-25	Shah Ghulam Qadir	PML(N)	14,341	33.24%	Mian Abdul Waheed	PPP	12,400	28.74%	1,941	64,231	43,143	67.17%
Neelum	LA-26	Mian Abdul Waheed	PPP	18,870	44.48%	Raja Muhammad Ilyas Khan	PTI	13,294	31.34%	5,576	58,970	42,424	71.94%
Muzaffarabad	LA-27	Sardar Muhammad Javed	PPP	26,441	43.17%	Mir Attique ur Rehman	PTI	19,677	32.12%	6,674	87,706	61,254	69.84%
Muzaffarabad	LA-28	Syed Bazil Ali Naqvi	PPP	26,011	43.32%	Chaudhry Shahzad Mehmood	PTI	21,873	36.43%	4,138	81,511	60,037	73.66%
Muzaffarabad	LA-29	Khawaja Farooq Ahmed	PTI	13,337	30.83%	Iftikhar Gilani	PML(N)	10,557	24.40%	2,780	63,594	43,263	68.03%
Muzaffarabad	LA-30	Chaudhry Muhammad Rasheed	PTI	18,119	44.31%	Mustafa Bashir Abbasi	PML(N)	10,490	25.65%	7,629	57,030	40,890	71.70%
Muzaffarabad	LA-31	Chaudhry Latif Akbar	PPP	22,824	33.56%	Saqib Majeed Raja	AJKMC	21,481	31.58%	1,343	106,580	68,015	63.82%
Hattian Bala	LA-32	Raja Farooq Haider	PML(N)	15,598	32.31%	Muhammad Ashfaq Zaffar	PPP	15,204	31.49%	394	70,865	48,278	68.13%
Hattian Bala	LA-33	Dewan Ali Khan Chughtai	PTI	26,474	54.08%	Raja Farooq Haider	PML(N)	14,384	29.38%	12,090	67,868	48,953	72.13%
Jammu & Others	LA-34	Riaz Ahmed Gujjar	PTI	4,320	41.41%	Nasir Hussain Dar	PML(N)	3,545	33.98%	775	18,542	10,433	56.54%
Jammu & Others	LA-35	Maqbool Ahmed Gujjar	PTI	18,934	41.38%	Chaudhry Muhammad Ismail	PML(N)	16,855	36.84%	2,079	85,247	45,756	55.43%
Jammu & Others	LA-36	Hafiz Hamid Raza	PTI	22,096	41.30%	Muhammad Ishaq	PML(N)	20,467	38.26%	1,629	93,804	53,500	57.03%
Jammu & Others	LA-37	Muhammad Akmal Sargala	PTI	26,039	42.11%	Muhammad Siddique Chaudhry	PML(N)	25,726	41.61%	313	95,694	61,833	64.62%
Jammu & Others	LA-38	Muhammad Akbar Chaudhry	PTI	14,283	40.18%	Choudhary Zeeshan Younas Tanda	PML(N)	8,755	30.76%	5,528	48,504	28,461	58.68%
Jammu & Others	LA-39	Raja Muhammad Siddique	PML(N)	9,557	42.69%	Nazia Niaz	PTI	7,510	33.54%	2,047	36,455	22,389	61.42%
Kashmir Valley	LA-40	Aamir Abdul Ghaffar Lone	PPP	2,165	61.73%	Muhammad Saleem Butt	PTI	875	24.95%	1,290	5,327	3,507	65.83%
Kashmir Valley	LA-41	Ghulam Mohi-ud-Din Diwan	PTI	2,326	70.61%	Muhammad Ikram Butt	PML(N)	741	22.50%	1,585	5,050	3,294	66.23%
Kashmir Valley	LA-42	Muhammad Asim Sharif	PTI	1,254	43.86%	Syed Shaukat Ali Shah	PML(N)	1,205	42.15%	49	4,461	2,859	64.09%
Kashmir Valley	LA-43	Javed Butt	PTI	782	43.66%	Naseema Khatoon Wani	PML(N)	720	40.20%	62	2,457	1,791	72.89%
Kashmir Valley	LA-44	Muhammad Ahmad Raza Qadri	PML(N)	2,027	44.72%	Mehr un Nisa	AJKMC	1,195	26.36%	832	6,340	4,533	71.50%
Kashmir Valley	LA-45	Abdul Majid Khan	PTI	3,138	57.10%	Abdul Nasir Khan	IND	2,063	37.54%	1,075	6,951	5,496	79.07%

== See also ==
- List of members of the 10th Legislative Assembly of Azad Kashmir
- Azad Jammu & Kashmir Election Commission
- 2024 Jammu and Kashmir Legislative Assembly election
