= 2016 Azad Kashmiri general election =

2016 Azad Kashmir general election
- 21 July 2016

41 of the 49 seats in the Azad Kashmir Legislative Assembly 25 seats needed for a majority
- Turnout: 62.2%
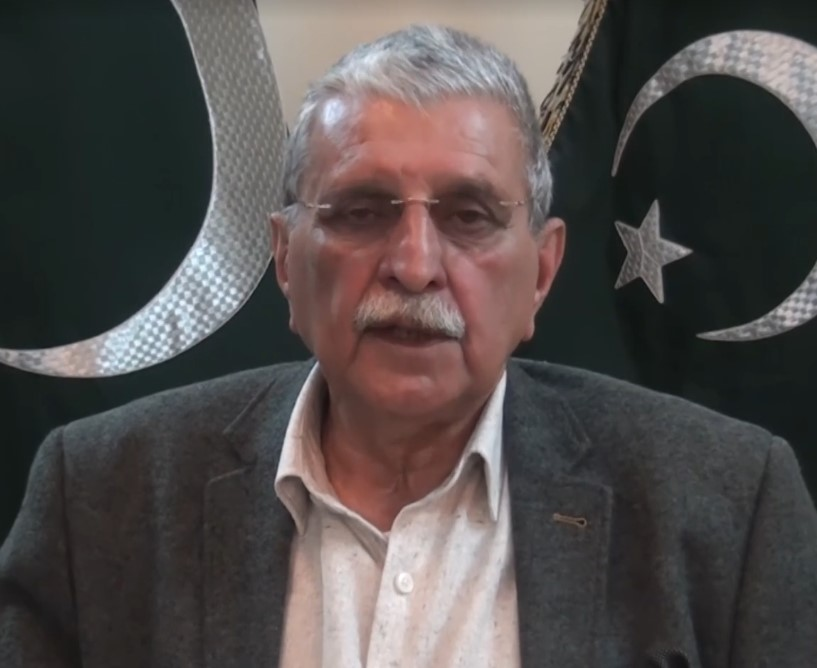

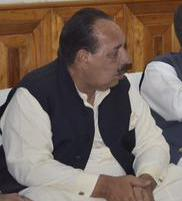

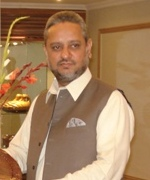

	First party	Second party	Third party
Leader	Raja Farooq Haider	Chaudhry Abdul Majid	Attique Ahmed Khan
Party	PML(N)	PPP	AJKMC
Leader's seat	Muzaffarabad-V	Mirpur-II	Bagh-I
Last election	11 seats	27 seats	5 seats
Seats won	36	4	3
Seat change	▲25	▼23	▼2
Popular vote	739,195	352,742	171,458
Percentage	44.4%	21.2%	10.3%
	Fourth party
Leader	Sultan Mehmood Chaudhry
Party	PTI
Leader's seat	Mirpur-III (lost)
Last election	Did not contest
Seats won	2
Seat change	▲2
Popular vote	211,827
Percentage	12.7%
- Map of Azad Kashmir showing Assembly Constituencies and winning parties
Prime Minister before election
Chaudhry Abdul Majid
PPP
Elected Prime Minister
Raja Farooq Haider
PML(N)

General elections were held in Azad Kashmir on 21 July 2016 to elect 41 members of the Azad Kashmir Legislative Assembly. Polling started at 8:00am and continued until 5:00pm.

== Campaign ==
At least 423 candidates ran for the 41 seats, the main competition being between the Pakistan Muslim League-Nawaz (PML-N), Pakistan Tehreek-e-Insaf (PTI), All Jammu and Kashmir Muslim Conference (AJKMC) and the Pakistan People’s Party (PPP). 5,427 polling stations were set up for the election

== Results ==
2,674,586 people were registered to vote in the elections, of whom 1,190,839 were female and 1,483,747 male.

The PML-N won 31, the PPP three, and PTI two. In addition, the AJKMC won three seats, the Jammu Kashmir Peoples Party (JKPP) won one seat and one seat was won by an independent. After the election, the PML(N) was able to elect its members to three seats reserved for women, one for ulema, and one for overseas. On the other hand, the PPP was able to win one reserved seat for women. Due to a pre-election agreement with the PML(N), the Jamaat-e-Islami (JI) was also able to get one of its members elected to a reserved seat for women and another to a reserved seat for technocrats.

== Aftermath ==
Following these results, the PML(N) was able to form a comfortable majority government, electing Raja Farooq Haider as prime minister of Azad Kashmir, controlling 36 out of the 49 seats in the assembly, while also enjoying support from the two JI MLAs. His opponents, Chaudhry Muhammad Yasin of the PPP and Ghulam Mohiuddin Dewan of the PTI, each garnered five votes each.

== See also ==
- List of members of the 8th Legislative Assembly of Azad Kashmir
