= Azad Kashmir Legislative Assembly =

Unicameral legislature of Azad Kashmir

Azad Kashmir Legislative Assembly آزاد کشمیر مجلسِ قانون ساز
- 12th Azad Kashmir Legislative Assembly
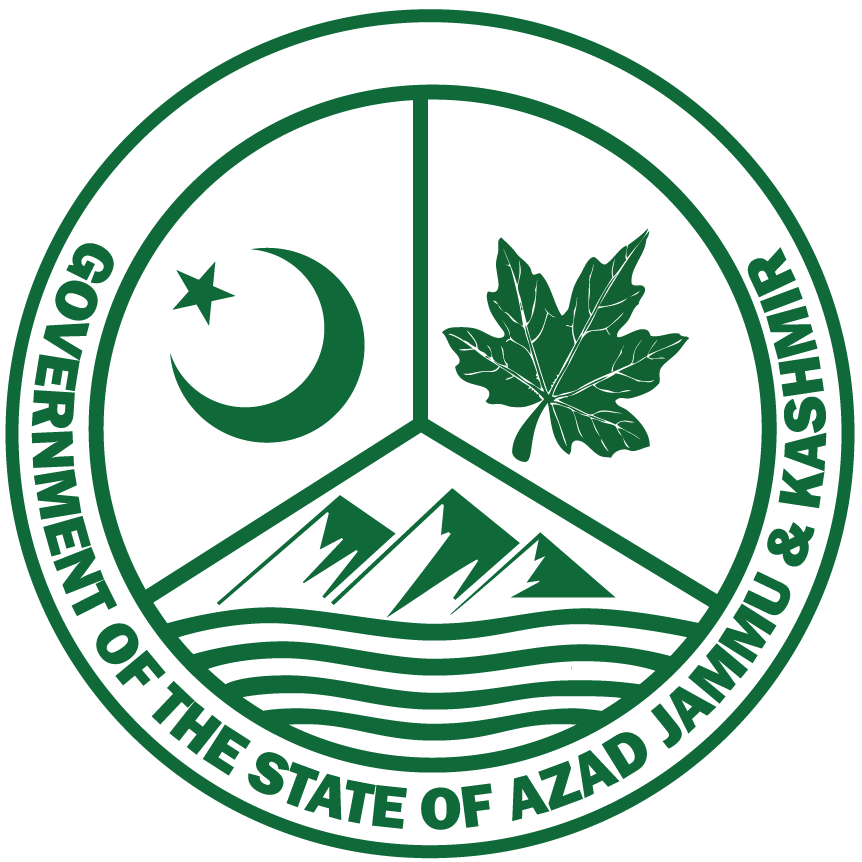

Type
- Type: Unicameral
- Term limits: 5 years

History
- New session started: August 24, 2026; 56 days ago

Leadership
- Speaker: Chaudhry Tariq Farooq, PML(N) since 25 August 2026
- Deputy Speaker: Muhammad Ahmed Raza Qadri, PML(N) since 25 August 2026
- Prime Minister of Azad Jammu and Kashmir: Iftikhar Gilani, PML(N) since 28 August 2026
- Leader of the Opposition: Chaudhry Muhammad Yasin, PPP since 28 August 2026

Structure
- Seats: 53
- Political groups: Government (32): PMLN (31); JKADB (1); Opposition (14): PPP (14); Vacant (7)

Elections
- Voting system: Mixed member majoritarian: 45 seats elected by FPTP; 5 seats for women, 1 seat for technocrats, 1 seat for ulema, 1 seat for overseas through PR
- Last election: 27 July to 10 August 2026
- Next election: TBD

Meeting place
- Muzaffarabad, Azad Kashmir

Website
- www.ajkassembly.gok.pk

Constitution
- Interim Constitution of Azad Jammu and Kashmir

The Legislative Assembly of Jammu and Kashmir, also known as AJK Legislative Assembly, is a unicameral legislature of elected representatives of the autonomous state of Azad Jammu and Kashmir, which is located in Muzaffarabad. It was established under the Interim Constitution of AJK having a total of 53 seats, with 45 general seats (of which 33 are elected from constituencies within the Azad Kashmir territory and 12 from seats reserved for refugees from Indian administered Jammu and Kashmir who live across Pakistan), while 8 are reserved of which 5 are for women, 1 for ulama, 1 for a technocrat and 1 for J&K nationals residing abroad.

== Members of Legislative Assembly ==
The members of legislative Assembly are elected for a five-year term on the basis of adult franchise and one person, one vote.

== List of Assemblies of Azad Kashmir ==
No.	Name	Term start	Term end
1	1st Assembly of the Azad Kashmir	1971	1975
2	2nd Assembly of the Azad Kashmir	1975	1977
3	3rd Assembly of the Azad Kashmir	1985	1990
4	4th Assembly of the Azad Kashmir	1990	1991
5	5th Assembly of the Azad Kashmir	1991	1996
6	6th Assembly of the Azad Kashmir	1996	2001
7	7th Assembly of the Azad Kashmir	2001	2006
8	8th Assembly of the Azad Kashmir	2006	2011
9	9th Assembly of the Azad Kashmir	2011	2016
10	10th Assembly of the Azad Kashmir	2016	2021
11	11th Assembly of the Azad Kashmir	2021	2026
12	12th Assembly of the Azad Kashmir	2026	

== Speakers of Azad Jammu and Kashmir Legislative Assembly ==
No.	Names	Start of term	End of term
1	Sheikh Manzar Masood	7 January 1971	30 June 1975
2	Mohammad Mansha Khan	30 June 1975	11 August 1977
3	Mohammad Ayub Khan	15 June 1985	29 June 1990
4	Sahibzada Muhammad Ishaq Zaffar	29 June 1990	29 July 1991
5	Abdul Rashid Abbasi	29 July 1991	30 July 1996
6	Raja Mumtaz Hussain Rathore	30 July 1996	22 June 1998
7	Chaudhry Abdul Majid	22 June 1998	24 July 2001
8	Muhammad Sayab Khalid Khan	24 July 2001	24 July 2006
9	Shah Ghulam Qadir	24 July 2006	12 August 2010
10	Chaudhry Anwarul Haq	16 August 2010	25 July 2011
11	Sardar Ghulam Sadiq	25 July 2011	30 July 2016
12	Shah Ghulam Qadir	30 July 2016	3 August 2021
13	Chaudhry Anwarul Haq	3 August 2021	20 April 2023
14	Chaudhry Latif Akbar	3 June 2023	25 August 2026
15	Chaudhry Tariq Farooq	25 August 2026	

== See also ==
- 2016 Azad Kashmiri general election
- Constituency LA-37 Jammu - 4 (Narowal)
- Government of Azad Kashmir
- List of Azad Kashmir Legislative Assembly constituencies
- President of Azad Kashmir
- Prime Minister of Azad Kashmir
