= List of Azad Kashmiris =

This is an alphabetical list of notable Azad Kashmiris.

== A ==
- Abdul Hamid Khan
- Abdul Rahman Khan
- Abdul Rashid Abbasi
- Abdur Rasheed Turabi
- Adil Rashid
- Afaq Raheem
- Amjad Ali Chaudhri
- Arsalan Arif
- Asrar
- Attique Ahmed Khan
- Aziz Khan

== B ==
- Baba Shadi Shaheed

== C ==
- Chaudhry Abdul Majid
- Chauhdry Abdul Rashid

== D ==
- D. P. Roy Choudhury

== F ==
- Farooq Haider Khan

== G ==
- Ghulam Ahmad
- Ghulam-us-Saqlain Naqvi

== I ==
- Ilyas Kashmiri
- Imran Arif
- Imtiaz Abbasi
- Irfan Sabir
- Irfan Talib

== K ==
- Khalid Ibrahim Khan
- Khan Muhammad Khan

== M ==
- Masood Khan
- Mian Muhammad Bakhsh
- Matloob Inkalabi
- Michael Masih
- Mohammed Ajeeb
- Moeen Ali
- Muhammad Abdul Qayyum Khan
- Muhammad Anwar Khan
- Muhammad Yaqoob Khan

== N ==
- Nazir Ahmed, Baron Ahmed

== Q ==
- Qamar Zaman Khan
- Qurban Hussain

== R ==
- Raja Muhammad Zulqarnain Khan
- Rashid Naseer

== S ==
- Saif Ali Janjua
- Salman Irshad
- Sayab Khalid
- Sepoy Maqbool Hussain
- Shabir Choudhry
- Sikandar Hayat Khan
- Sultan Muzaffar Khan

== T ==
- Tabarak Dar

- Azad Kashmiri diaspora
