= Raja Farooq Haider Khan =

Kashmiri politician

Raja Muhammad Farooq Haider
- راجہ محمد فاروق حیدر خان
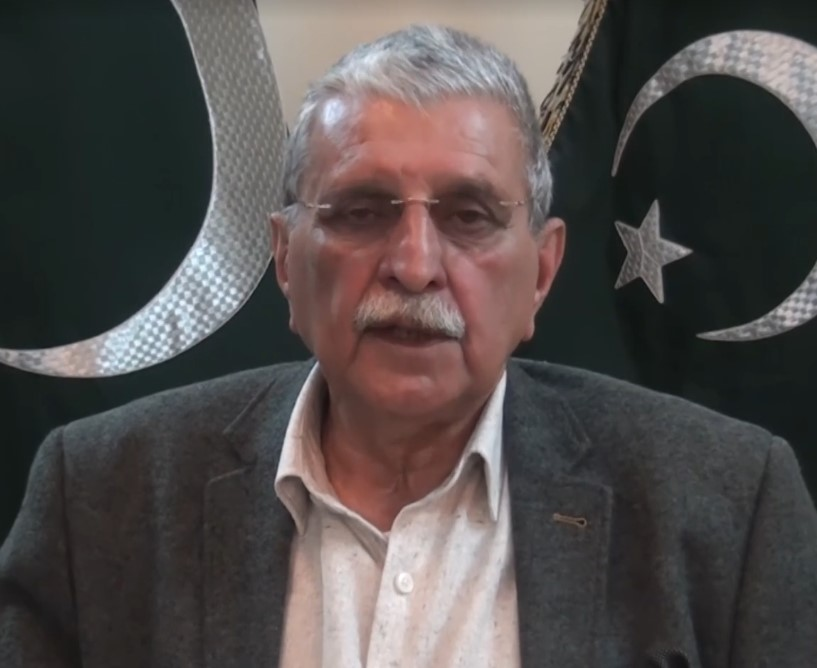

Prime Minister of Azad Kashmir
- In office 31 July 2016 – 30 July 2021
- President: Masood Khan
- Preceded by: Chaudhry Abdul Majid
- Succeeded by: Abdul Qayyum Niazi
- In office 23 October 2009 – 29 July 2010
- President: Raja Zulqarnain Khan
- Preceded by: Sardar Yaqoob Khan
- Succeeded by: Sardar Attique Ahmed

Leader of the Opposition in Azad Jammu and Kashmir Legislative Assembly
- In office 2011–2016

Chairman Public Accounts Committee Azad Jammu and Kashmir
- In office 2006–2009
- President: Raja Zulqarnain Khan
- Prime Minister: Sardar Attique Ahmed

Special Assistant to the Prime Minister of Azad Kashmir
- In office 2003–2006
- President: Sardar Anwar Khan
- Prime Minister: Sardar Sikandar Hayat

Chairman Prime Minister Inspection Commission AJ&K
- In office 2001–2003
- President: Sardar Anwar Khan
- Prime Minister: Sardar Sikandar Hayat

Minister of Azad Jammu and Kashmir
- In office 1991–1996
- President: Sardar Sikandar Hayat
- Prime Minister: Sardar Abdul Qayyum

Senior Minister of Azad Jammu and Kashmir
- In office 1985–1990
- President: Sardar Abdul Qayyum
- Prime Minister: Sardar Sikandar Hayat

Minister for Education of Azad Jammu and Kashmir
- In office 1985–1990
- President: Sardar Abdul Qayyum
- Prime Minister: Sardar Sikandar Hayat

Member of the Azad Jammu and Kashmir Legislative Assembly
- Incumbent
- Assumed office 3 August 2021
- Constituency: LA-31 Muzaffarabad-VI
- In office 2016–2021
- In office 2011–2016
- In office 2006–2011
- In office 1991–1996
- In office 1985–1990
- Constituency: Muzaffarabad

Personal details
- Born: October 1, 1955 (age 71) Muzaffarabad, Azad Kashmir, Pakistan
- Party: PMLN present 1993
- Spouse: Robina Farooq
- Children: Madeeha Farooq, Raja Usman Haider, Raja Haider Khan. Grand Children : Jannat Bilal Khar
- Education: Government College University Lahore
- Website: pmajk.gov.pk

Raja Muhammad Farooq Haider Khan (Urdu: راجہ محمد فاروق حیدر خان) is an Azad Kashmiri politician and former Prime Minister of Azad Jammu and Kashmir. He is a senior member of the Pakistan Muslim League (N).

== Early life and education ==
Raja Muhammad Farooq Haider Khan was born on 1 October 1955.

He was born in Muzaffarabad, Azad Kashmir but his family house lies in Downtown, Srinagar now in Indian Kashmir, from where his parents moved due to partition.

He received his school education from Abbottabad Public School (APS), which is one of the most renowned and historic educational institution in the North West of Pakistan. He completed his intermediate also from Abbottabad Public School. Haider completed his graduation from Government College University, Lahore, which is one of the oldest seats of learning in the Muslim world.

== Family ==
Raja Muhammad Farooq Haider Khan belongs to a well known Kashmiri-speaking political family in AJ&K. He inherited the career from his family.

His father Raja Muhammad Haider Khan led the Muslim Conference being the President of Muslim Conference for two times i.e. in 1960 and 1963.

His mother Mohterma Saeeda Khan holds the honor to be the first female Member of Azad Jammu and Kashmir Legislative Assembly in the history of Azad Jammu & Kashmir (AJ&K).

His uncle Raja Muhammad Latif Khan was elected as a Member of AJ&K Legislative Assembly in 1970.

His sister Ms. Noreen Haider (aka Mrs. Noreen Jamshed) also remained a Member of AJ& K Legislative Assembly from 1991 to 1996.

== Political career ==
Raja Farooq Haider Khan started his early political career with All Jammu and Kashmir Muslim Conference (AJKMC) where his father served as a President for two tenures. Haider remained President of Muslim Conference for Muzaffarabad District, Azad Kashmir from 1986 to 1990. From 1989 to 2001, Haider remained Chairman of the Central Parliamentary Board of Muslim Conference AJ&K. He remained General Secretary of the Muslim Conference AJ&K from 1997 until 2001. From 2004 to 2006, he remained Senior Deputy President Muslim Conference AJ&K.

He was elected to the Azad Kashmir Legislative Assembly from LA-27 Muzaffarabad-V in the 1985 Azad Kashmiri general election. During this term, he served as a parliamentary secretary, but was later elevated to the cabinet as a senior member in 1988.

He was reelected to the Assembly from LA-27 Muzaffarabad-V in the 1991 Azad Kashmiri general election, and held a ministerial position until 1996.

He was defeated in the 2001 Azad Kashmiri general election, but was later appointed as the chairman of Prime Minister Sikandar Hayat Khan’s Implementation Commission and later as a special adviser.

He unsuccessfully contested the 2006 Azad Kashmiri general election from LA-28 Muzaffarabad-V as a candidate of AJKMC, being defeated by Sahibzada Muhammad Ishaq Zaffar, a candidate of Pakistan People's Party (PPP).

He was re-elected to the Assembly in a 2006 by-election from LA-28 Muzaffarabad-V, which was called due to Zaffar's death on 2 September 2006, as a candidate of AJKMC. He received 24,005 votes and defeated Sahibzada Ashfaq Zaffar, a candidate of PPP.

Due to differences with Prime Minister Attique Ahmed Khan, he formed a forward bloc in AJKMC. On 6 January 2009, over allegations of corruption and nepotism, Ahmed Khan's government was ousted through a no-confidence motion that received support from the Haider Khan-led forward bloc and PPP. In his place, Muhammad Yaqoob Khan was elected to position of Prime Minister.

Haider Khan and Ahmed Khan set aside their disagreements and both factions of AJKMC jointly submitted a no-confidence motion against Prime Minister Yaqoob Khan on 13 October 2009. The prime minister resigned the next day.

Both factions of AJKMC supported Haider Khan's nomination, and he was elected as the Prime Minister on 22 October 2009, receiving 29 votes and defeating Yaqoob Khan, who received 19 votes.

Ahead of a no-confidence motion that was submitted by AJKMC members, 18 members of his cabinet resigned on 25 July 2010. He resigned the next day, and was replaced by former Prime Minister Attique Ahmed Khan.

In December 2010, he convinced Nawaz Sharif, the president of Pakistan Muslim League (N) (PML(N)), to form a chapter in Azad Kashmir. Haider Khan was appointed as the chapter's chief organiser on 26 December 2010.

He was re-elected to the Assembly from LA-26 Muzaffarabad-III and LA-28 Muzaffarabad-V as a candidate of PML(N) in the 2011 Azad Kashmiri general election. He chose to retain LA-28 Muzaffarabad-V. Under his stewardship, PML(N) won 10 seats in the Assembly.

After the election, he was nominated by PML(N) for the position of Prime Minister, but was unsuccsessful. He received 11 votes and was defeated by Chaudhry Abdul Majid of PPP. Subsequently, on 2 August 2011, he was appointed as the Leader of the Opposition.

On April 5, 2012, he was elected unopposed as the president of PML(N)'s Azad Kashmir chapter.

He was re-elected to the Assembly from LA-28 Muzaffarabad-V as a candidate of PML(N) in the 2016 Azad Kashmiri general election. He received 30,625 votes and defeated Sahibzada Ashfaq Zaffar of PPP.

After the election, as PML(N) had won a majority of seats, he was elected as Prime Minister on, receiving 38 votes and defeating Chaudhry Muhammad Yasin of PPP and Ghulam Mohiuddin Deewan of Pakistan Tehreek-e-Insaf (PTI), who each received five votes. He was sworn in on the same day.

A sedition case was filed against him in October 2020. On 5 October 2020, he was booked in a treason case along with key leaders of PML(N), including Maryam Nawaz.

He was re-elected to the Assembly from LA-32 Muzaffarabad-VI as a candidate of PML(N) in the 2021 Azad Kashmiri general election. He received 25,598 votes and defeated Sahibzada Ashfaq Zaffar, a candidate of PPP. In the same election, he contested from LA-33 Muzaffarabad-VII as a candidate of PML(N), but was unsuccessful. He received 14,384 votes and was defeated by Dewan Ali Khan Chughtai, a candidate of PTI.

He was re-elected to the Assembly from LA-32 Muzaffarabad-VI as a candidate of PML(N) in the 2026 Azad Kashmiri general election. He received 21,613 votes and defeated a candidate of Sahibzada Ashfaq Zaffar, a candidate of PPP.

== Helicopter firing incident ==
On 30 September 2018, Haider's helicopter came under fire from the Indian Army when he was travelling to Forward Kahuta (his village near the Line of Control) He barely escaped the attack near Abbaspur village while travelling with two AJK ministers and his personal staff officer in the civilian helicopter. According to him, the incident took place at around 12:10 pm PST.
