= 1985 Azad Kashmiri general election =

1985 Azad Kashmir general election
- 1985

All 48 seats in the Azad Kashmir Legislative Assembly
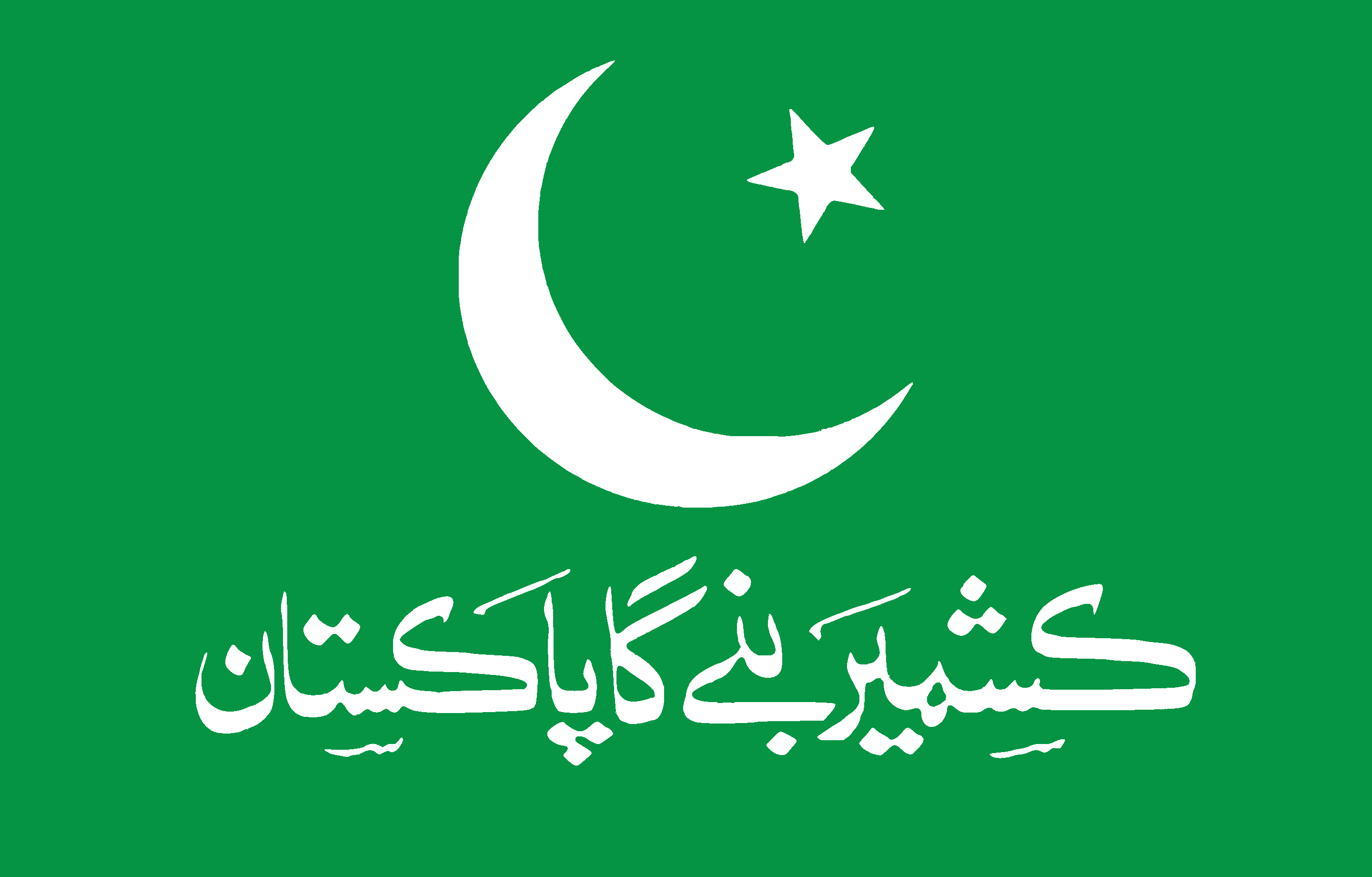
	First party	Second party	Third party
Leader	Muhammad Abdul Qayyum Khan	Muhammad Hayat Khan	K. H. Khurshid
Party	AJKMC	Tehrik-e-Amal	Jammu and Kashmir Liberation League
Seats won	19	8	4
	Fourth party	Fifth party
Leader	Sardar Ibrahim Khan
Party	Azad Muslim Conference	Independent
Seats won	2	7
Prime Minister before election
Abdul Rahman Khan (as President/Chief Executive)
Independent
Elected Prime Minister
Sikandar Hayat Khan
AJKMC

General elections were held in Azad Kashmir in 1985 to elect the members of the third assembly of Azad Kashmir, the first general election in Azad Kashmir since the imposition of martial law in Pakistan in July 1977. The All Jammu and Kashmir Muslim Conference (AJKMC), backed by the military government of Pakistani President General Muhammad Zia-ul-Haq, won the election against a seven-party opposition alliance. Sardar Sikandar Hayat Khan of the AJKMC was elected as Prime Minister on 17 June 1985, while AJKMC president Sardar Muhammad Abdul Qayyum Khan was elected as President on 1 October 1985.

== Background ==
The second Assembly of Azad Kashmir, elected in the 1975 elections under the Interim Constitution Act, 1974, had been dissolved on 11 August 1977 following the military coup by General Zia-ul-Haq. Following the dissolution, Brigadier Muhammad Hayat Khan was appointed President and Chief Executive of Azad Kashmir on 31 October 1978, holding the position until 31 January 1983, when he was succeeded by Major General Abdul Rahman Khan.

The democratic system in Azad Kashmir remained suspended for nearly eight years. In Pakistan, non-partisan general elections were held on 25 February 1985, leading to the formation of a civilian government under Muhammad Khan Junejo. The legislative elections in Azad Kashmir followed a few months later, with Junejo's government in Islamabad giving its backing to the AJKMC.

In the run-up to the polls, seven opposition parties formed an alliance against the AJKMC, led by K. H. Khurshid of the Jammu and Kashmir Liberation League. The alliance also included the Tehrik-e-Amal led by Brigadier Muhammad Hayat Khan, the Islami Jamhoori Party, the Democratic Front, the Jamaat-e-Islami Azad Kashmir, the Inqilabi Mahaz and the Azad Jamhoori Mahaz. The Jamaat-e-Islami subsequently boycotted the elections in protest against what it called the Zia government's preferential treatment of the AJKMC.

The Azad Kashmir Pakistan Peoples Party (AJKPPP), which had formed the previous elected government before the 1977 coup, did not officially contest the polls because it refused to register under the Political Parties Ordinance, 1979, which required all parties to formally pledge support for the eventual accession of Jammu and Kashmir to Pakistan. A number of independent candidates sympathetic to the AJKPPP nevertheless stood for election.

== Results ==
Polling took place on a non-partisan basis for the 40 directly elected general seats in the Azad Kashmir Legislative Assembly, comprising 28 territorial constituencies within Azad Kashmir and 12 reserved for Jammu and Kashmiri refugees settled in Pakistan. The AJKMC emerged as the largest party with 19 seats, followed by the Tehrik-e-Amal with eight seats, the Jammu and Kashmir Liberation League with four seats, and the Azad Muslim Conference, led by Sardar Ibrahim Khan, with two seats. Independent candidates, most of them regarded as sympathetic to the unregistered AJKPPP, won the remaining seven seats.

== Aftermath ==
On 15 June 1985, the new Assembly elected Mohammad Ayub Khan as its Speaker. Two days later, on 17 June 1985, Sardar Sikandar Hayat Khan of the AJKMC was elected as Prime Minister, succeeding Khan Abdul Hamid Khan, whose tenure had ended with the imposition of martial law in 1977. On 1 October 1985, the AJKMC's veteran leader Sardar Muhammad Abdul Qayyum Khan was elected as President of Azad Kashmir, succeeding the military-appointed Major General Abdul Rahman Khan and returning to the office he had previously held from 1970 to 1975.

The third Assembly served its full five-year term, becoming the first Assembly in Azad Kashmir to do so under the Interim Constitution Act, 1974. The Assembly approved 109 bills and passed several resolutions on the Kashmir issue and other matters of public importance. During its tenure, the Interim Constitution was amended to provide six additional seats to the Assembly, bringing the total strength of the legislature to 48 members, 40 directly elected and eight reserved (five for women, one for ulema, one for technocrats and one for overseas Kashmiris).

The AJKMC government remained closely aligned with the Junejo administration in Islamabad, and survived the November 1988 elections in which the Pakistan Peoples Party under Benazir Bhutto came to power at the federal level. The Assembly served until 1990, when it was succeeded by the fourth Assembly following fresh general elections held on 21 May 1990, in which the AJKPPP defeated the incumbent AJKMC government.
