= Chaudhry Abdul Majid =

Pakistani politician

- چوہدری عبدالمجید
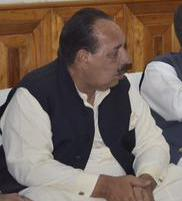

Prime Minister of Azad Kashmir
- In office 26 July 2011 – 29 July 2016
- Preceded by: Attique Ahmed Khan
- Succeeded by: Raja Farooq Haider Khan

Speaker of Azad Kashmir Legislative Assembly
- In office 22 June 1998 – 24 July 2001
- Preceded by: Raja Mumtaz Hussain Rathore
- Succeeded by: Muhammad Sayab Khalid Khan

President of Pakistan Peoples Party Azad Kashmir
- In office 2006–2016
- Succeeded by: Chaudhry Latif Akbar

Leader of the Opposition in the Azad Kashmir Legislative Assembly
- In office 4 February 2011 – 26 July 2011
- Preceded by: Attique Ahmed Khan
- Succeeded by: Raja Farooq Haider Khan

Member of the Azad Kashmir Legislative Assembly
- In office 1985 – 3 August 2021
- Succeeded by: Chaudhry Qasim Majeed
- Constituency: LA-2 Mirpur-II

Personal details
- Born: 1946 (age 79–80)
- Party: Pakistan People's Party
- Children: Chaudhry Qasim Majeed (son)

Chaudhry Abdul Majid (Urdu: چوہدری عبدالمجید) is an Azad Kashmiri politician who served as the Prime Minister of Azad Kashmir from 2011 to 2016, as the Speaker of the Azad Kashmir Legislative Assembly from June 1998 to July 2001, and as the Leader of the Opposition from February to July 2011. He had also been the President of the Pakistan People's Party's in Azad Kashmir Chapter from 2006 to 2016. He also served as a member of the Assembly from 1985 to 3 August 2021.

== Political career ==
Majid was elected to the Azad Kashmir Legislative Assembly from LA-2 Mirpur-II as a candidate of Pakistan People's Party (PPP) in the 1985, 1990, 1991, 1996, and 2001 elections.

On 22 June 1998, he was elected as the Speaker of the Assembly.

He was re-elected to the Assembly from LA-2 Mirpur-II as a candidate of PPP in the 2006 Azad Kashmiri general election.

In 2006, he was appointed as the leader of PPP in Azad Kashmir.

On 4 February 2011, he was appointed as the Leader of the Opposition in the Assembly.

He was re-elected to the Assembly from LA-2 Mirpur-II as a candidate of PPP in the 2011 Azad Kashmiri general election.

After taking oath as a member on July 2011, he was elected as the Prime Minister of Azad Kashmir. He received 35 votes and defeated Raja Farooq Haider Khan, a candidate of Pakistan Muslim League (N) (PML(N)).

He was re-elected to the Assembly from LA-2 Mirpur-II as a candidate of PPP in the 2016 Azad Kashmiri general election. He received 12,143 votes and defeated Muhammad Nazir, a candidate of PML(N).

After PPP's defeat in the 2016 elections, he resigned as the president of the party's Azad Kashmir chapter, and was succeeded by Chaudhry Latif Akbar.

On 2021, he quit electoral politics in favour of his son, Chaudhry Qasim Majeed.
