= 1990 Azad Kashmiri general election =

1990 Azad Kashmir general election
- 21 May 1990

All 48 seats in the Azad Kashmir Legislative Assembly

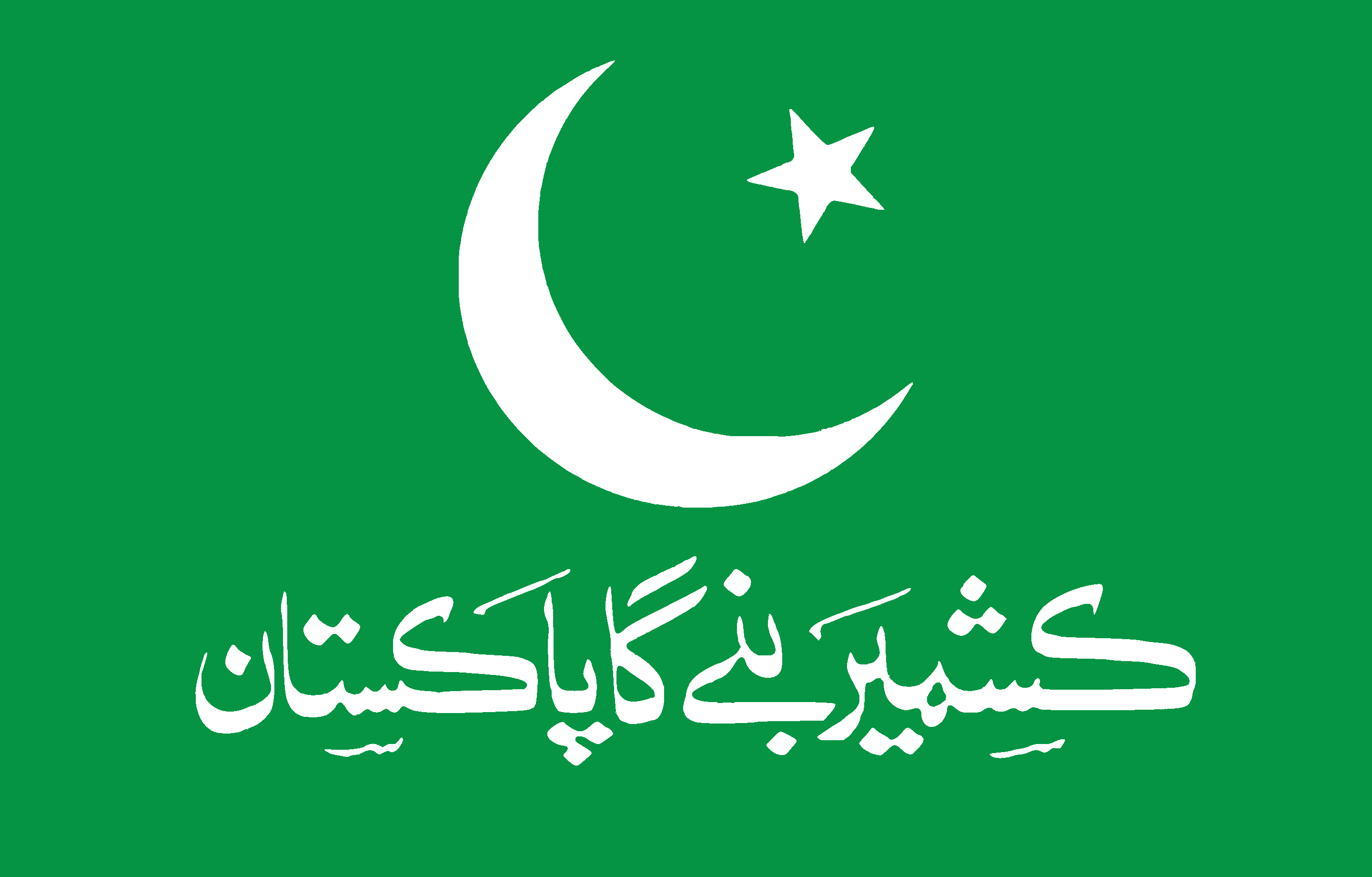
	First party	Second party	Third party
Leader	Raja Mumtaz Hussain Rathore	Sikandar Hayat Khan	Sardar Ibrahim Khan
Party	PPP	AJKMC	Azad Muslim Conference
Seats won	16	16	3
Prime Minister before election
Sikandar Hayat Khan
AJKMC
Elected Prime Minister
Raja Mumtaz Hussain Rathore
PPP

General elections were held in Azad Kashmir on 21 May 1990 to elect the members of the fourth assembly of Azad Kashmir. The Azad Kashmir Pakistan Peoples Party (AJKPPP), allied with the federal government of Pakistani Prime Minister Benazir Bhutto, won the election by defeating the incumbent All Jammu and Kashmir Muslim Conference (AJKMC) government of Sardar Sikandar Hayat Khan, who was succeeded as Prime Minister by Raja Mumtaz Hussain Rathore.

== Background ==
The third Assembly of Azad Kashmir, elected in the 1985 elections held under General Zia-ul-Haq's martial law, had completed its five-year tenure. Sardar Sikandar Hayat Khan of the AJKMC had served as Prime Minister since 17 June 1985, while Sardar Muhammad Abdul Qayyum Khan, the AJKMC's leader, had served as President since 1 October 1985. By 1988, the political environment in Pakistan had shifted following the death of General Zia in an air crash in August 1988 and the subsequent victory of Benazir Bhutto's Pakistan Peoples Party (PPP) in the November 1988 general election, which raised the political fortunes of the PPP's local affiliate, the Azad Kashmir Pakistan Peoples Party (AJKPPP).

In the run-up to the polls, the AJKPPP and the AJKMC emerged as the principal contenders, with several smaller local parties, including the Sardar Ibrahim Khan-led Azad Muslim Conference (AMC), the Tehrik-e-Amal led by Brigadier Muhammad Hayat Khan and the Jammu and Kashmir Liberation League (JKLL) founded by K. H. Khurshid, also fielding candidates. The pro-independence Jammu and Kashmir Liberation Front (JKLF) was barred from contesting the elections, as it refused to sign the mandatory pledge of support for the eventual accession of Jammu and Kashmir to Pakistan required of all candidates under the Interim Constitution Act, 1974.

== Results ==
Polling took place on 21 May 1990 for the 40 directly elected general seats in the Azad Kashmir Legislative Assembly, which comprised 28 territorial constituencies within Azad Kashmir and 12 constituencies reserved for Jammu and Kashmiri refugees settled in Pakistan. The AJKPPP and the AJKMC each secured 16 seats, with eight of the AJKMC's seats coming from the refugee constituencies. The Azad Muslim Conference won three seats, while the Tehrik-e-Amal and the Jammu and Kashmir Liberation League won one seat each, with the remaining seats divided among minor parties and independents.

== Aftermath ==
On the floor of the new Assembly, Raja Mumtaz Hussain Rathore of the AJKPPP defeated the AJKMC's Sardar Sikandar Hayat Khan in the prime ministerial election by 29 votes to 15, with support from the AJKPPP's coalition partners. However, Sardar Abdul Qayyum Khan, who remained President of Azad Kashmir, refused to administer the oath of office to Rathore and his 17 members, describing the PPP as an "anti-national and anti-Islam party". After pressure from the Bhutto-led federal government in Islamabad, the Speaker of the Assembly eventually administered the oath of office to Rathore, whose formal tenure began on 29 June 1990.

Sahibzada Ishaq Zaffar of the AJKPPP was elected as the Speaker of the new Assembly on 29 June 1990, succeeding Mohammad Ayub Khan. Sardar Sikandar Hayat Khan led the AJKMC opposition in the Assembly.

Rathore's government became politically vulnerable following the August 1990 dismissal of the Bhutto government in Islamabad by President Ghulam Ishaq Khan and the subsequent victory of Nawaz Sharif's Islami Jamhoori Ittehad in the October 1990 Pakistani general election. Although Nawaz Sharif and the President of Pakistan initially gave Rathore assurances that his government would not be destabilised, the AJKMC, under President Abdul Qayyum Khan, began a campaign for his removal. Within a year of the elections, Rathore dissolved the Assembly and called fresh elections for 29 June 1991.

The fourth Assembly's tenure of only about a year was the shortest of any elected Assembly in Azad Kashmir's history. It passed no legislation, although it adopted several resolutions on the Kashmir issue and other matters of public concern. Rathore subsequently lost the 1991 elections and accused Nawaz Sharif's government of rigging the vote, declaring the results "null and void" before being dismissed from office and arrested on 5 July 1991 by the federal government in Islamabad.
