= 1991 Azad Kashmiri general election =

1991 Azad Kashmir general election
- 29 June 1991

All 48 seats in the Azad Kashmir Legislative Assembly
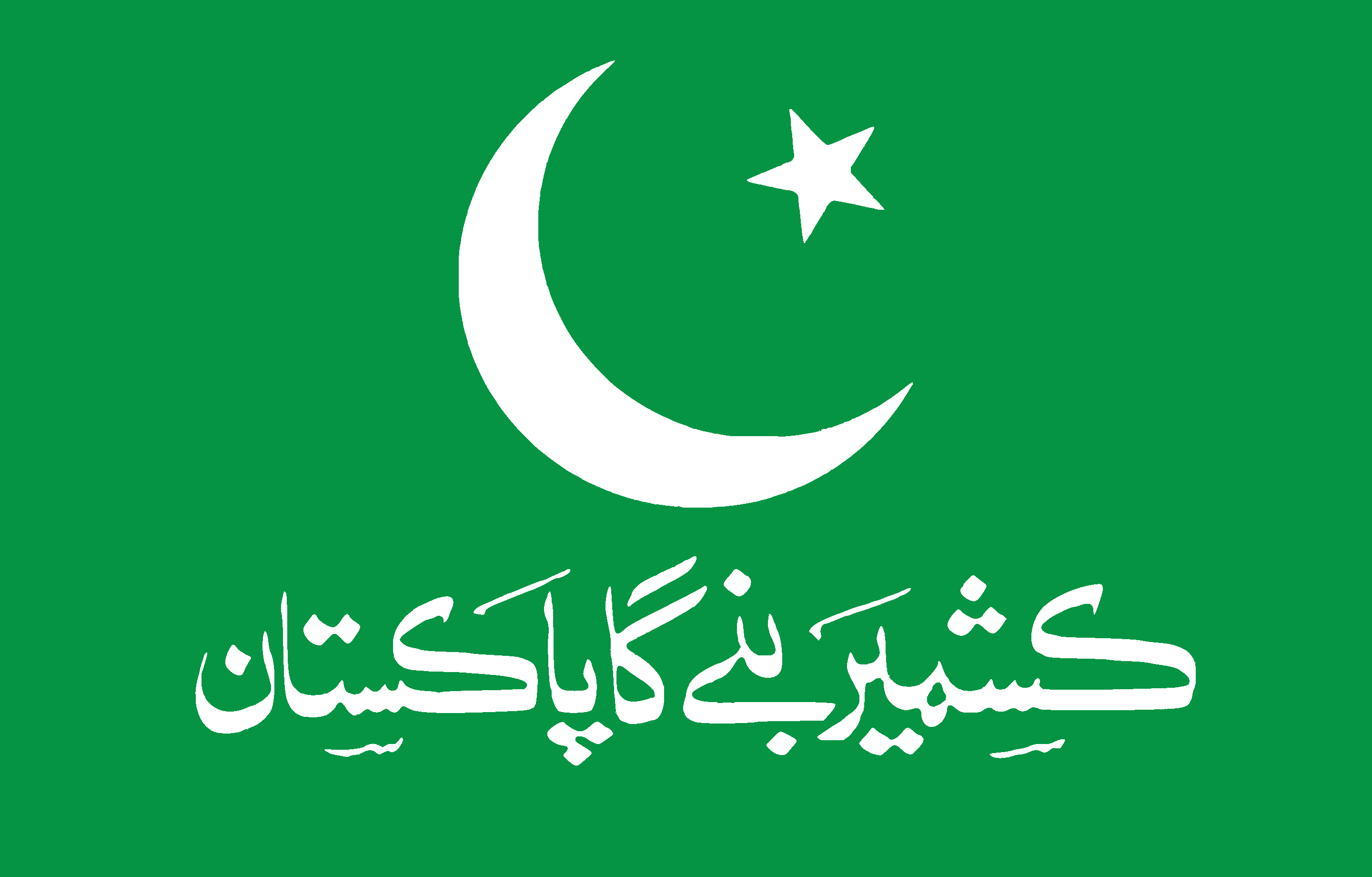

	First party	Second party
Leader	Muhammad Abdul Qayyum Khan	Raja Mumtaz Hussain Rathore
Party	AJKMC	PPP
Seats won	24	10
Prime Minister before election
Raja Mumtaz Hussain Rathore
PPP
Elected Prime Minister
Muhammad Abdul Qayyum Khan
AJKMC

General elections were held in Azad Kashmir on 29 June 1991 to elect the members of the fifth assembly of Azad Kashmir. The All Jammu and Kashmir Muslim Conference (AJKMC), backed by Pakistani Prime Minister Nawaz Sharif's Islami Jamhoori Ittehad (IJI), won a landslide victory, defeating the incumbent government allied to former Pakistani Prime Minister Benazir Bhutto's Pakistan Peoples Party (PPP). The outgoing Prime Minister, Raja Mumtaz Hussain Rathore, refused to accept the results and was subsequently removed from office, and was succeeded as Prime Minister by Sardar Muhammad Abdul Qayyum Khan.

== Background ==
The fourth Assembly of Azad Kashmir, elected in the 1990 elections, had a short tenure of only about a year. In May 1990, Raja Mumtaz Hussain Rathore, an ally of Benazir Bhutto's Pakistan Peoples Party, had been elected Prime Minister, with his term formally beginning on 29 June 1990. In Pakistan, the August 1990 dismissal of Bhutto's federal government by President Ghulam Ishaq Khan and the subsequent victory of Nawaz Sharif's Islami Jamhoori Ittehad in the October 1990 general election altered the political environment. Rathore was forced to call fresh elections in Azad Kashmir following the ouster of the Bhutto government that had been supporting him, with Abdul Qayyum Khan-led AJKMC opposition in Muzaffarabad aligning with the new federal administration in Islamabad. Rathore subsequently dissolved the assembly, leading to elections being scheduled for 29 June 1991.

== Results ==
Polling took place on 29 June 1991, accompanied by widespread violence in which at least 14 people died in clashes between supporters of rival political parties. The AJKMC, backed by Sharif's IJI, secured 24 of the 40 directly elected general seats in the Legislative Assembly, while the Azad Kashmir Peoples Party, an ally of Bhutto's PPP, won 10 seats. Other seats were divided between minor parties and independents. AJKMC leader Sardar Sikandar Hayat Khan, who had served as the Prime Minister from 1985 to 1990, was returned to the assembly from his Kotli constituency, while AJKMC president Sardar Abdul Qayyum Khan was also elected. Among the notable casualties of the election was Sultan Mehmood Chaudhry of the Pakistan Peoples Party, who lost his Mirpur seat, one of only two general elections he failed to win between 1985 and 2021.

Outgoing Prime Minister Rathore alleged massive vote fraud sanctioned by the federal government in Islamabad and refused to recognise the results. Former Pakistani Prime Minister Ghulam Mustafa Jatoi also accused the Sharif government of rigging the vote. On 3 July 1991, Rathore declared the results "null and void", announced fresh polls for September and replaced the Islamabad-appointed chief election commissioner in the territory. AJKMC leader and the then President of Azad Kashmir Abdul Qayyum Khan denounced Rathore's actions as "treason".

On 5 July 1991, the federal government of Pakistan invoked its powers under the Azad Kashmir Interim Constitution Act to dismiss Rathore from office and order his arrest. His arrest sparked protests across Azad Kashmir, and he was released after a few days.

== Aftermath ==
Following the removal of Rathore, the AJKMC moved to form the new government. On 20 July 1991, Abdul Qayyum Khan resigned from the presidency to contest the prime ministerial election, and Sahibzada Ishaq Zaffar, the outgoing Speaker of the Assembly, took charge as acting President. On 29 July 1991, the new Assembly elected Abdul Qayyum Khan as the Prime Minister, succeeding Rathore. Abdul Rashid Abbasi was elected as the new Speaker of the Assembly, also serving as the interim President of Azad Kashmir from 29 July to 12 August 1991.

On 12 August 1991, Sardar Sikandar Hayat Khan, the former Prime Minister and a senior AJKMC leader, was elected to a five-year term as the President of Azad Kashmir. Rathore took up the position of Leader of the Opposition, a role he held until 1996. In 1993, Rathore led nearly 2,000 supporters in a protest march to Muzaffarabad and was again briefly detained by authorities.

The fifth Assembly served its full five-year term until 1996, during which it approved 145 bills and passed resolutions on the Kashmir issue and other matters of public importance. It hosted delegations from several countries, including the United States, the United Kingdom and various European nations, during its tenure. The AJKMC government remained in office until being defeated by the PPP in the 1996 elections, when Rathore returned to the Assembly and was elected as its Speaker.
