= 1996 Azad Kashmiri general election =

1996 Azad Kashmir general election
- 30 June 1996

All 48 seats in the Azad Kashmir Legislative Assembly

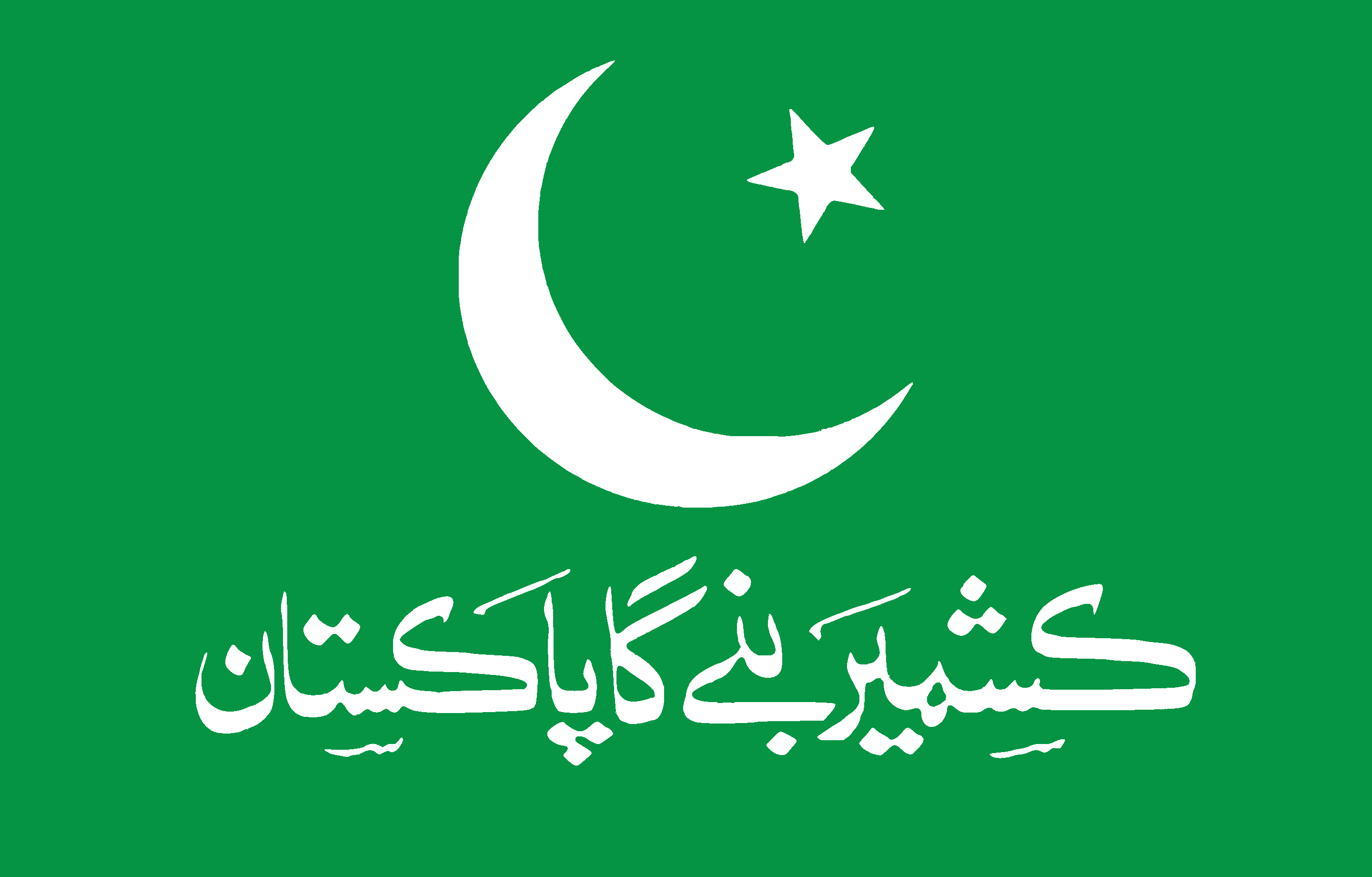
	First party	Second party
Leader	Sultan Mehmood Chaudhry	Muhammad Abdul Qayyum Khan
Party	PPP	AJKMC
Leader's seat	Mirpur-III	Bagh-I
Seats won	37	9
Prime Minister before election
Muhammad Abdul Qayyum Khan
AJKMC
Elected Prime Minister
Sultan Mehmood Chaudhry
PPP

General elections were held in Azad Kashmir on 30 June 1996 to elect the members of sixth assembly of Azad Kashmir. The Pakistan People's Party (PPP) won the election, defeating the incumbent All Jammu and Kashmir Muslim Conference (AJKMC) government of Muhammad Abdul Qayyum Khan, who was succeeded as Prime Minister by Sultan Mehmood Chaudhry.

== Results ==
After the election to reserved seats, the PPP had won 37 of the 48 available seats, while the AJKMC won only nine. The Pakistan Muslim League (J) (PML-J), a PPP ally, and Jamaat-e-Islami (JI) both also won a seat each.

== Aftermath ==
The PPP easily formed government, electing Sultan Mehmood Chaudhry as the Prime Minister, and Muhammad Ibrahim Khan as the President. On 30 July, the PPP also elected Raja Mumtaz Hussain Rathore and Raja Israr Ahmed Abbasi as the Speaker and Deputy Speaker, respectively. On 5 November 1996, Muhammad Abdul Qayyum Khan was appointed as the Leader of the Opposition.
