= 2006 Azad Kashmiri general election =

Election in Azad Kashmir

2006 Azad Kashmir general election
- 11 July 2006

41 of the 49 seats in the Azad Kashmir Legislative Assembly 25 seats needed for a majority
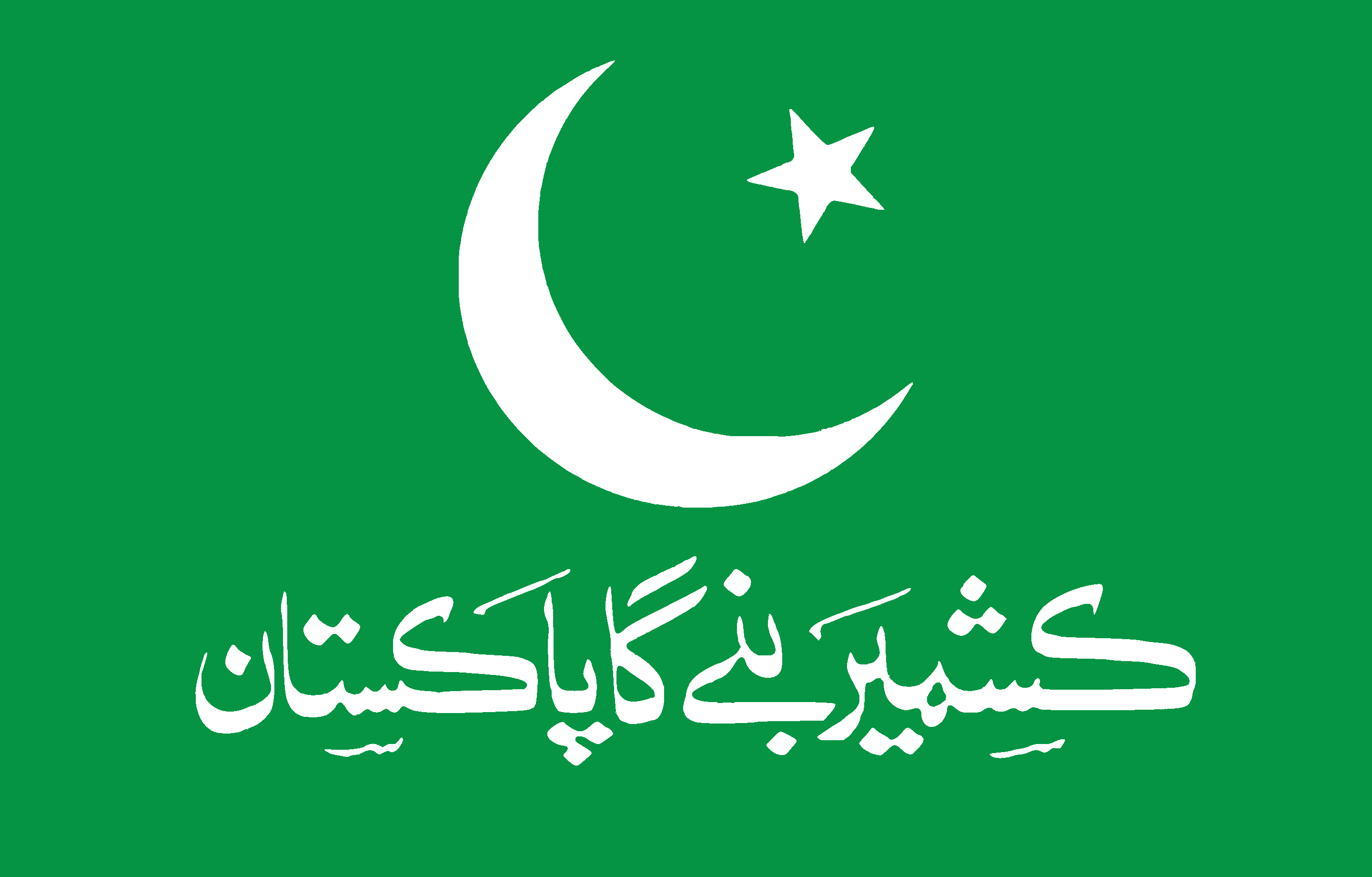

	First party	Second party	Third party
Leader	Attique Ahmed Khan	Sahibzada Muhammad Ishaq Zaffar	Sultan Mehmood Chaudhry
Party	AJKMC	PPP	PML
Leader's seat	Bagh-I	Muzaffarabad-V	Mirpur-III
Last election	27	17	Did not contest
Seats won	27	8	4
Seat change	Steady	▼9	▲4
	Fourth party	Fifth party
Leader	Tahir Khokhar	N/A
Party	MQM	Independent
Leader's seat	Jammu and Others-I
Last election	Did not contest	3
Seats won	2	6
Seat change	▲2	▲3
- Map of Azad Kashmir showing Assembly Constituencies and winning parties
Prime Minister before election
Sardar Sikandar Hayat Khan
AJKMC
Elected Prime Minister
Attique Ahmed Khan
AJKMC

General elections were held in Azad Kashmir on 11 July 2006 to elect the members of eighth assembly of Azad Kashmir. Sardar Attique Ahmed Khan and Raja Zulqarnain Khan were elected as Prime Minister and President of Azad Kashmir, respectively.

== Results ==
The All Jammu and Kashmir Muslim Conference (AJKMC) won twenty general seats, the Pakistan People's Party seven, the People's Muslim League (PML) four the Muttahida Qaumi Movement (MQM) two, and the Jammu Kashmir Peoples Party (JKPP) one. Six independents also won seats, although three of them joined the AJKMC after the election. LA-33 Jammu and Others-IV had its election postponed by four days, which saw another AJKMC victory. Following the elections, the AJKMC managed to win four seats reserved for women and one reserved seat each for ulema, technocrats, and overseas. On the other hand, the PPP only won one reserved seat for women.

Therefore, the AJKMC managed to have thirty-one members in the Assembly, the PPP eight, the PML four, independents three, the MQM two, and the JKPP one.

== Aftermath ==
The AJKMC continued governing Azad Kashmir, easily electing its leader, Attique Ahmed Khan, as the next Prime Minister. Khan had received 35 votes and defeated Sahibzada Muhammad Ishaq Zaffar of the PPP, who received only eight votes. The AJKMC was also able to elect Shah Ghulam Qadir and Sardar Farooq Tahir as Speaker and Deputy Speaker of the Assembly, respectively.

== Controversies ==
Candidates from the Jammu Kashmir Liberation Front and other pro-independence groups were not allowed to run; local law prohibits persons expressing views counter to "the ideology of Pakistan, the ideology of the State’s accession to Pakistan or the sovereignty, integrity of Pakistan" from running for office. Opposition groups saw the vote as rigged in favour of the Pakistani federal government.
