= Attique Ahmed Khan =

Pakistani politician

- سردار عتیق احمد خان
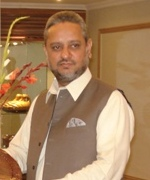

President of the AJKMC
- Incumbent
- Assumed office 2003

Prime Minister of Azad Jammu and Kashmir
- In office 29 July 2010 – 26 July 2011
- Preceded by: Raja Farooq Haider
- Succeeded by: Chaudhry Abdul Majid
- In office 24 July 2006 – 6 January 2009
- Preceded by: Sardar Sikandar Hayat Khan
- Succeeded by: Sardar Muhammad Yaqoob Khan

Member of the Azad Jammu and Kashmir Legislative Assembly
- In office 24 July 2001 – 25 August 2026
- Preceded by: Malik Asghar Hussain Awan
- Succeeded by: Sajid Iqbal Abbasi
- Constituency: LA-29 Jammu and Others-I (2001-2006); LA-13 Bagh-I (2006-2021); LA-14 Bagh-I (2021-present)
- In office 29 June 1990 – 30 July 1996
- Constituency: LA-29 Jammu and Others-I

Personal details
- Born: 21 January 1955 (age 71)
- Party: AJMKC (1990-present)
- Parent: Muhammad Abdul Qayyum Khan (father)

Attique Ahmed Khan (Urdu: سردار عتیق احمد خان; born 21 January 1955) is a Pakistani-Kashmiri politician who had served as the President of the All Jammu and Kashmir Muslim Conference political party 2025 2002. He was elected twice as the Prime Minister of Azad Jammu and Kashmir from 24 July 2006 to 6 January 2009, and for a second term from 29 July 2010 to 26 July 2011. He served as the Leader of the Opposition from 15 January 2009 to 22 October 2009. He has been elected five times as a Member of the Legislative Assembly. He has also worked in the Supreme Council of the Muslim World League.

== Early life and background ==
Attique Ahmed Khan was born on 21 January 1955, in Pakistan to Sardar Abdul Qayyum Khan. Khan obtained his Masters in International Relations and Arabic language from the Islamic University of Madinah in Saudi Arabia.

Khan served as the president of the All Jammu & Kashmir Muslim Conference, a political party, from 2003 to 2019.

== Political career ==
Khan was elected to the Azad Kashmir Legislative Assembly from LA-29 Jammu and Others-I as a candidate of All Jammu and Kashmir Muslim Conference (AJKMC) in the 1990 Azad Kashmiri general election. He was re-elected in the 1991 Azad Kashmiri general election, and the 2001 Azad Kashmiri general election.

He was re-elected to the Assembly from LA-13 Bagh-I as a candidate of AJKMC in the 2006 Azad Kashmiri general election.

After the election, he became the Prime Minister of Azad Kashmir after being nominated by AJKMC. He received 35 votes and defeated Sahibzada Muhammad Ishaq Zaffar, a candidate of Pakistan People's Party (PPP). On 24 July 2006, he was sworn in by Muhammad Anwar Khan, the President of Azad Kashmir.

He had developed differences with Raja Farooq Haider Khan, another member of the Assembly from AJKMC, who resultingly formed a forward bloc in the party. On 6 January 2009, this bloc, with support from PPP, ousted Ahmed Khan's government through a motion of no-confidence. He was replaced by Muhammad Yaqoob Khan.

On 15 January 2009, he was appointed as the Leader of the Opposition in the Assembly, a position he held until 22 October 2009, when he re-joined the treasury benches.

Haider Khan and Ahmed Khan set aside their disagreements and both factions of AJKMC jointly submitted a no-confidence motion against Prime Minister Muhammad Yaqoob Khan on 13 October 2009. The prime minister resigned the next day. On 22 October 2009, Haider Khan was elected as Prime Minister with support from both factions.

Ahead of a no-confidence motion that was submitted by AJKMC members, Haider Khan resigned on 26 July 2010. Attique Ahmed Khan was re-elected to the position of Prime Minister on 29 July 2010, receiving 39 votes and defeating Haider Khan, who boycotted the election. His government lasted until 26 July 2011, when a new Assembly elected Chaudhry Abdul Majid of PPP to the position of Prime Minister.

He was re-elected to the Assembly from LA-13 Bagh-I as a candidate of AJKMC in the 2011 Azad Kashmiri general election. He received 20,115 votes and defeated Latif Khaliq, a candidate of Jamaat-e-Islami Pakistan (JI).

He was re-elected to the Assembly from LA-13 Bagh-I as a candidate of AJKMC in the 2016 Azad Kashmiri general election. He received 23,551 votes and defeated Raja Iftikhar Ayub, a candidate of Pakistan Muslim League (N) (PML(N)).

He was re-elected to the Assembly from LA-14 Bagh-I as a candidate of AJKMC in the 2021 Azad Kashmiri general election. He received 29,561 votes and defeated Latif Khaliq, a candidate of Pakistan Tehreek-e-Insaf (PTI).

On 18 December 2022, he was re-elected as the President of AJKMC, a position he has held since 2003.

He contested the 2026 Azad Kashmiri general election from LA-14 Bagh-I as a candidate of AJKMC, but was unsuccessful. He received 20,885 votes and was defeated by Sajid Iqbal Abbasi, a candidate of Jammu and Kashmir Awami Dast-o-Bazu (JKADB).
