= 2011 Azad Kashmiri general election =

Election in self-governing state of Pakistan

2011 Azad Kashmir general election
- 26 June 2011

41 of the 49 seats in the Azad Kashmir Legislative Assembly 25 seats needed for a majority
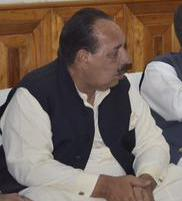

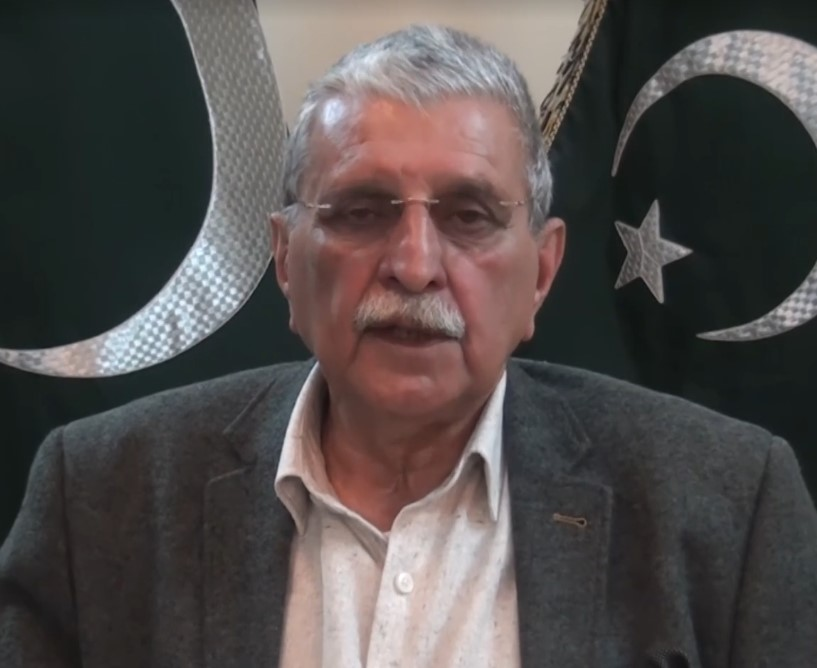

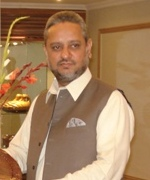

	First party	Second party	Third party
Leader	Chaudhry Abdul Majid	Raja Farooq Haider Khan	Attique Ahmed Khan
Party	PPP	PML(N)	AJKMC
Leader's seat	Mirpur-II	Muzaffarabad-III; Muzaffarabad-V	Bagh-I
Last election	8 seats	Did not contest	27 seats
Seats won	27	11	5
Seat change	▲19	▲11	▼22
	Fourth party
Leader	Tahir Khokhar
Party	MQM
Leader's seat	Jammu and Others-I
Last election	2 seats
Seats won	2
Seat change	Steady
- Map of Azad Kashmir showing Assembly Constituencies and winning parties
Prime Minister before election
Attique Ahmed Khan
AJKMC
Elected Prime Minister
Chaudhry Abdul Majid
PPP

General elections were held in Azad Kashmir on 26 June 2011 to elect the members of ninth assembly of Azad Kashmir.

== Results ==
The Pakistan People's Party (PPP) won 21 seats, Pakistan Muslim League (N) (PML(N)) 10, the All Jammu and Kashmir Muslim Conference (AJKMC) 4, and the Muttahida Qaumi Movement (MQM) 2. Independent candidates won three seats. All of the three independents later joined the PPP. Elections were postponed in LA-37 Kashmir Valley-II.

After the election, the PPP won three reserved seats for women and one reserved seat each for ulema, technocrats, and overseas. On the other hand, the PML(N) and AJKMC each won a reserved seat for women.

== Aftermath ==
The PPP was able to comfortably elect Chaudhry Abdul Majid as the next Prime Minister of Azad Kashmir. He received 35 votes in the prime ministerial election while his opponent, the PML(N)'s Farooq Haider Khan, received only 11 votes. The new government consisted of the PPP, the AJKMC, and the MQM.
