= Chaudhry Ghulam Abbas =

Pakistani politician

Raees-ul-Ahrar Chaudhry Ghulam Abbas
- Born: 4 February 1904; Jammu, Jammu and Kashmir, British India
- Died: 18 December 1967 (aged 63); Rawalpindi, Punjab, Pakistan
- Education: Prince of Wales College, Jammu, Lahore Law College
- Occupation: Politician
- Years active: 1940–1967
- Known for: Kashmir conflict leader All Jammu and Kashmir Muslim Conference founder

Chaudhry Ghulam Abbas (4 February 1904 – 18 December 1967) was a leading politician of Jammu and Kashmir and the President of the Muslim Conference party. After his migration to Pakistan administered Kashmir in 1947, he became the head of the Azad Kashmir (AJK) government.

== Early life and career ==
Chaudhry Ghulam Abbas was born to Chaudhry Nawab Khan in a middle-class family in Jammu on 4 February 1904. His ancestors moved from Jalandhar in Punjab during the middle of the 19th century. He graduated from the Prince of Wales College, Jammu, and received law degree from the Lahore Law College. He started his career as a lawyer in Jammu.

He reorganized the socio-political organization Young Men’s Muslim Association, which was established earlier in 1909 and was the only platform that Muslims were using to raise their political voice in Jammu and Kashmir. This organization held some massive demonstrations against the Dogra rule. As a result, the Association became very popular among the Muslim public.

To protect the rights of the Muslims of the Valley of Kashmir, another organization, All Jammu and Kashmir Muslim Conference was established. Its president was Sheikh Abdullah while Chaudhry Ghulam Abbas was elected as its secretary general. Later the organization was renamed as Jammu and Kashmir National Conference. But when Sheikh Abdullah developed his association with Nehru and the All India National Congress, Chaudhry Ghulam Abbas withdrew from the National Conference. Consequently, the Muslim Conference was revived under the leadership of Chaudhry Ghulam Abbas and Agha Shaukat Ali.

The Muslim Conference demanded Kashmir affiliation to Pakistan on 19 July 1947.

Chaudhry Ghulam Abbas campaigned for the affiliation of the people of Jammu and Kashmir with Pakistan. He arrived in Pakistan after the transfer of prisoners in 1948 when the ceasefire in the Kashmir conflict took effect and served the Azad Kashmir government till 1951. He presented the case of Pakistan in the United Nations along with Muhammad Ibrahim Khan when India took the Kashmir issue there. United Nations ended up drawing the cease-fire line to stop the fighting.

In 1951, he resigned as head of the Azad Kashmir government and did not participate in government politics after that.

He was the first person who delivered the first ever lecture of the FG Sir Syed College, The Mall, Rawalpindi, when the college started

== Death and legacy ==
Abbas died of stomach cancer in Rawalpindi on 18 December 1967 and was laid to rest in Faizabad near Rawalpindi, close to the capital city of Islamabad, Pakistan.

In 1995, Pakistan Postal Services issued a commemorative postage stamp to honor his services.

In 2006, a public event was organized in Rawalpindi, Pakistan to observe his death anniversary on 19 December 2006 where the leaders of the All Jammu and Kashmir Muslim Conference, Sardar Abdul Qayyum and Sardar Sikandar Hayat Khan paid tributes to him.

In 2014, on the death anniversary of Chaudhry Ghulam Abbas, an event was organized at Aiwan-i-Karkunan-i-Tehreek-i-Pakistan in Lahore to pay tributes to this dedicated leader of Pakistan Movement and Kashmir liberation struggle.

== Books ==
=== By him ===
- Kashmakash, 2010. Autobiography.

=== About him ===
- Qāʼid-i Kashmīr : Chaudhrī G̲h̲ulām ʻAbbās, 1988, by Bashīr Aḥmad Quraishī.
- Ḥayāt-i Qāʼid-i Kashmīr, Chauhdrī G̲h̲ulām ʻAbbās, 1992, by Sayyid Mahmūd Āzād.
- Chauhdrī G̲h̲ulām ʻAbbās : Shak̲h̲ṣiyyat aur Kārnāme, 1992, by G̲h̲ulām Ḥusain Aẓhar.
- Qāʼid-i Millat Chauhdarī G̲h̲ulām ʻAbbās, 2004, by Javvād Ḥusain Jaʻfarī.
- Qāʼid-i Kashmīr aur Taḥrīk-i Kashmīr, 2005, by Muḥammad Yaʻqūb Chauhdarī.
