= 2001 Azad Kashmiri general election =

2001 Azad Kashmir general election
- 5 July 2001

All 48 seats in the Azad Kashmir Legislative Assembly 25 seats needed for a majority
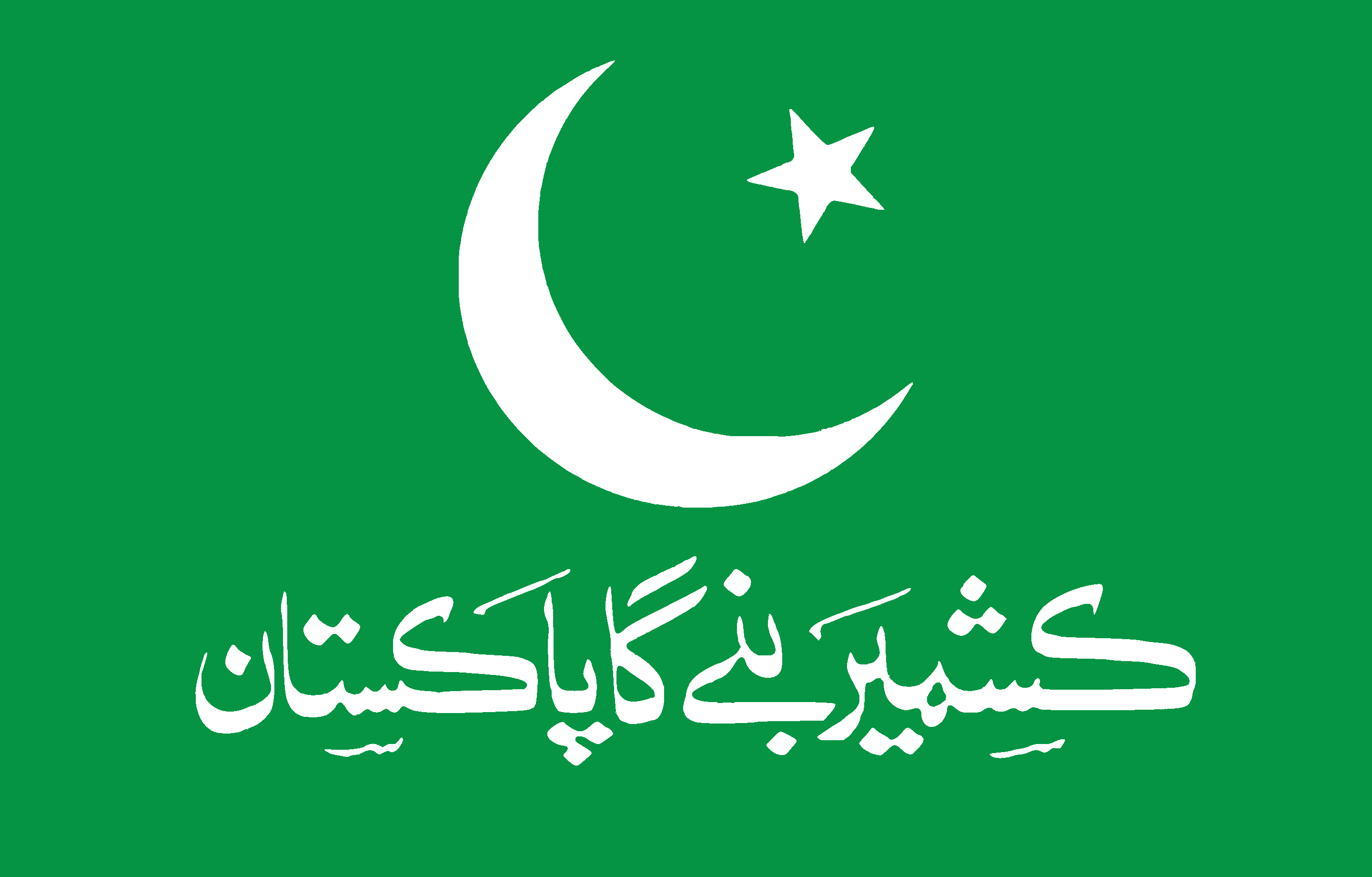

	First party	Second party
Leader	Sikandar Hayat Khan	Sultan Mehmood Chaudhry
Party	AJKMC	PPP
Leader's seat	Kotli-II	Mirpur-III
Last election	9	37
Seats won	27	17
Seat change	▲18	▼20
Prime Minister before election
Sultan Mehmood Chaudhry
PPP
Elected Prime Minister
Sikandar Hayat Khan
AJKMC

General elections were held in Azad Kashmir on 5 July 2001 to elect the members of seventh assembly of Azad Kashmir. The All Jammu and Kashmir Muslim Conference (AJKMC) won the election, defeating the incumbent Pakistan People's Party (PPP) government of Sultan Mehmood Chaudhry, who was succeeded by Sikandar Hayat Khan as Prime Minister.

== Results ==
On election day, the AJKMC won 21 general seats, the PPP won 15 seats, independent candidates won 3 seats, and the Pakistan Muslim League Azad Kashmir (PML-AK), led by Muhammad Hayat Khan, won one seat. The three independents later joined the AJKMC, raising their number of seats to 24. Elections to reserved seats saw the AJKMC winning three reserved seats for women, and one seat each reserved for ulema, technocrats, and overseas, while the PPP won the other two seats reserved for women. This left the final seat tally at: 30 seats for the AJKMC, 17 seats for the PPP, and one seat for the PML-AK.

== Aftermath ==
The AJKMC easily formed a government, electing Sikandar Hayat Khan as the Prime Minister and Muhammad Anwar Khan as the President. On 24 July 2001, Muhammad Sayab Khalid Khan and Sanaullah Qadri were elected as Speaker and Deputy Speaker, respectively.
