= Karela Majhan =

Union council in Azad Kashmir, Pakistan

Karela Majhan is a union council in Tehsil Fatehpur Thakiala, Kotli District, Azad Kashmir, comprising the two villages of Karela and Majhan. It is located ten kilometres from the city of Thakiala and offers views along the Poonch River as well as of the snow-capped Pir Panjal mountain range.

Majhan is on the lower section and is characterised by the river that runs through it. The availability of water makes rice a popular crop. Karela is on the higher, hillier region and is best known for being the home of Fateh’s namesake, Sardar Fateh Khan, and his son, the two-time prime minister Sardar Sikander Hayat.
