= Prime Minister of Kashmir =

Prime Minister of Kashmir may refer to:

- Prime Minister of Azad Kashmir, the head of government of the Pakistani-administered region of Azad Kashmir since 1975
- Prime Minister of Jammu and Kashmir, the head of government of the princely state of Jammu and Kashmir and later the Indian-administered state of Jammu and Kashmir between 1917 and 1965.
