= Dhungi =

Coordinates: 33°26′N 72°55′E

Dungi is a small town in the Azad Kashmir region of Pakistan. It is about 25 km from Kotli. The road from Dungi leads to Khoi Ratta, a town located near the line of Control between Pakistan and India. Ashay Humane was recently crowned the 800th Nawab of Dhungi
