= Domaal Rajputs =

Muslim Rajput tribe

Domaal
- Ethnicity: Pahari
- Location: Rajouri District, Jammu and Kashmir; Nakyal and Khuiratta, Azad Kashmir
- Language: Pahari-Pothwari
- Religion: Islam

The Domaal Rajputs, also spelt Domal, and sometimes written as Doomal, are a Muslim Rajput tribe found principally in the divided district of Poonch in Jammu & Kashmir, as well as Rajouri District in Indian-administered Kashmir and Bagh District and Chikar in Azad Kashmir.

== History ==
According to their traditions regarding the origin of the Domaal tribe, one account traces them as a branch of the Chib tribe of Bhimber. According to this, the Domaal descend from two brothers, Dharam Chand and Puran Chand, who belonged to the seventh generation of Raja Chib Chand. Dharam Chand, during a visit to Delhi, converted to Islam. For this action, he was excommunicated by members of his tribe. His younger brother, Puran Chand, was then chosen as the new chief, but he too later embraced Islam, adopting the name Dom Khan. The Domaal are the descendants of Dom Khan, with the suffix aal among Pahari Rajputs signifying descent. Raja Dom Khan migrated from Bhimber and settled in Rajouri in the village of Rajdhani. He was buried at Narrouni, a small village near Rajdhani, where Domaal Rajputs still offer prayers at his grave.

The Doomal Rajputs reside in various villages of the Manjakote block of Rajouri and account for about 35% of the population in Rajouri district of Jammu and Kashmir. The community occupies the southwestern slopes of the Pir Panjal range. Their villages are found along the slopes of hills overlooking tributaries falling into the Poonch River and Chenab River. They are also found in the areas of Nakyal and Khuiratta in Azad Kashmir.

== Notable people ==
- Shabir Khan, former MLA in the Jammu and Kashmir Legislative Assembly and Health Minister
- Sikandar Hayat Khan, former president and Prime Minister of Azad Jammu and Kashmir
- Fateh Muhammad Khan Karelvi, politician and resistance fighter, father of Sikandar.
