= Khalid Hasan =

Pakistani journalist, writer (1934 - 2009)

- Born: April 14, 1934; Srinagar, Jammu and Kashmir
- Died: February 5, 2009 (aged 74); Washington, D.C., U.S.
- Occupations: Journalist; writer; author
- Spouse: Juanita
- Children: 2
- Father: Noor Hussain
- Awards: Sitara-i-Imtiaz (2010) by the President of Pakistan

Khalid Hasan (15 April 1934 – 5 February 2009) was a Pakistani journalist and writer. Author and editor of several books, in addition to being a regular columnist for a number of English-language Pakistani newspapers, he is best known for his translations of the short stories of Saadat Hasan Manto and the poems of Faiz Ahmed Faiz.

== Life and career ==
Khalid Hasan was born in Srinagar, Kashmir. His father, Noor Hussain, was from Jammu, and worked in the Jammu and Kashmir ministry of health. Khalid Hasan as well as the rest of the family migrated from Jammu to Pakistan during the 1947 communal violence. His two elder brothers (Brigadier General Bashir Ahmed and Saeed Ahmed) served in the Pakistan Army and a younger brother (Masood Hasan) ran an advertising business in Lahore. His sister Surayya was married to K. H. Khurshid who served Muhammad Ali Jinnah as his private secretary, then later became president of Azad Jammu and Kashmir. His second sister, Zohra, resides in Peshawar, Pakistan.

Khalid Hasan was sponsored by the American Political Science Association in the late 1960s for the Congressional Fellowship. So he moved to Washington, D.C., and there he met Juanita and married her.

Hasan began his long career in journalism and writing with The Pakistan Times, Lahore as senior reporter and columnist in 1967. He was asked by Zulfikar Ali Bhutto on taking office in December 1971 to join him as his first press secretary. He went on to spend five years in the country's foreign service, with postings in Paris, Ottawa and London. He resigned in protest when the Bhutto government was overthrown by Gen. Zia-ul-Haq and worked in London with the Third World Foundation and the Third World Media before leaving to join OPEC News Agency in Vienna, Austria, where he stayed for 10 years.

Khalid Hasan returned to Pakistan briefly in 1991 where he worked as a freelance journalist for the next two years. He moved to Washington, D.C., in 1993 and worked out of there as US correspondent for The Nation (Pakistan) (newspaper), Lahore. From 1997 to 2000 he was in Pakistan as head of the Shalimar Television Network. He returned to Washington in 2000 as special correspondent of the Associated Press of Pakistan, which he left to join Daily Times newspaper and The Friday Times newspaper, Lahore in 2002. He continued to work as the correspondent and columnist of these two publications in Washington, D.C. He died on 5 February 2009 in the United States. Hasan was a prolific writer and translator and had published over 40 books, in Pakistan and abroad.

== Death and survivors ==
Khalid Hasan died on 5 February 2009, in Washington, D.C., of gallbladder cancer at age 74. It was reported, at that time, that he would be buried in Vermont, where his wife Juanita comes from. He and Juanita had two children, a son Jeffrey and a daughter, Jahan, as well as four grandchildren. The family was present in the hospital, when he died.

=== Tributes ===
Ghulam Nabi Fai, Executive Director, Kashmiri American Council, called him a courageous and principled journalist. On his death anniversary in 2011, Radio Pakistan held a seminar and a classical music concert where he was ranked by some people alongside great Pakistani journalists such as Mazhar Ali Khan and I. A. Rehman. A notable Pakistani Urdu-language writer Iftikhar Arif called him one of the best translators of Urdu literature into English.

== Awards ==
Khalid Hasan received Sitara-i-Imtiaz Award ( Star of Excellence Award ) from the President of Pakistan in 2010.

== Published work ==
Eleven collections of reportage, political, literary and social writings

1. A Mug's Game, Pub. Ghulam Ali & Sons, Lahore (1968)
2. The Crocodiles are here to Swim, Pub. The Pakistan Times Press, Lahore (1970)
3. Scorecard, Pub. Wajidalis, Lahore (1984)
4. Give us Back our Onions, Vanguard, Lahore (1986)
5. The Umpire Strikes Back, Vanguard, Lahore (1988)
6. Private View, Sang-e-Meel Publications, Lahore (1991)
7. Question Time, Vanguard, Lahore (1993)
8. The Fourth Estate, Vanguard, Lahore (1995)
9. The Return of the Onion, Book Traders, Lahore (1996)
10. Remembrances – personal reminiscences, Vanguard, Lahore, ISBN 969-402-352-1 (2001)
11. Rearview Mirror: four memoirs, Alhamra, Islamabad (2002)

Edited Work

1. Politics of the People (3 vols.), the collected speeches and writings of Zulfikar Ali Bhutto Pakistan Publications, Rawalpindi (1973)
2. Muhammad Ali Jinnah, A Centenary Tribute, Embassy of Pakistan, London (1976)
3. The Unicorn and the Dancing Girl, the poetry of Faiz Ahmed Faiz, Allied Publishes, New Delhi, ISBN 978-0-8364-2360-0 (1988)
4. Memories of Jinnah, reminiscences of K.H. Khurshid, Oxford University Press, Karachi, ISBN 0-19-577406-X (1989)
5. Kashmir Holocaust, Kashmir Liberation Cell, Muzaffarabad (1992)
6. Pakistan Rules the World: winning the world cricket cup, Cricket Writers Forum, Islamabad (1993)
7. Azadi: Kashmir Freedom Struggle, 1924–98, Vanguard, Lahore (1999)
8. Zia Sarhadi’s Unfinished Memoir (under publication)
9. Qurratulain Hyder ke Khat ek Dost ke Naam (Urdu), Aaj Books, Karachi
10. Jammu, A city that was Sang-e-Meel Publications, Lahore (2003)
11. Memory Lane to Jammu, Sang-e-Meel Publications, Lahore (2004)

Translations (from Urdu and Punjabi into English)

1. Nothing but the Truth, short stories from Pakistan, Vikas, New Delhi, ISBN 0-7069-2128-3 (1982)
2. The Prisoner by Fakhar Zaman, Allied Publishers, New Delhi (1984)
3. The Lost Seven and Dead Man's Tale by Fakhar Zaman, Ajanta Publications, New Delhi ISBN 81-202-0249 X(1989)
4. Kingdom' End, selected stories of Saadat Hasan Manto, Verso, London, ISBN 0-86091-183-7 (1987)
5. The Tragedy of Afghanistan by Raja Anwar, Verso, London, ISBN 0-86091-208-6 (1988)
6. Partition, The 1947 stories of Saadat Hasan Manto, Viking, New Delhi, ISBN 0-670-83996-5 (1991)
7. Hotel Moenjodaro, the stories of Ghulam Abbas, Penguin, New Delhi, ISBN 0-14-026121-4 (1996)
8. Mottled Dawn – Saadat Hasan Manto's Partition writings, Penguin, New Delhi, ISBN 0-14-027212-7 (1997)
9. The Terrorist Prince, the life and death of Murtaza Bhutto by Raja Anwar, Verso, London, ISBN 1-85984-886-9 (1997)
10. Stars from Another Sky – Manto's Bombay Cinema of the 1940s, Penguin, New Delhi, (1998 )
11. Manto's World (Two Vols), Sang-e-Meel, Lahore, ISBN 969-35-1089-5 (2000)
12. The Women's Quarter and other Stories by Ghulam Abbas, Alhamra, Islamabad, ISBN 969-516-023-9 (2000)
13. A Wet Afternoon – Selected fiction and non-fiction of Saadat Hasan Manto, Alhamra, Islamabad, ISBN 969-516-040-9 (2001)
14. Letters to Uncle Sam by Saadat Hasan Manto, Alhamra, Islamabad, ISBN 969-516-047-6
15. Memories of Fatima Jinnah by Sorayya Khurshid, published by Government of Pakistan (2003)
16. O City of Lights, the poetry of Faiz Ahmed Faiz, Oxford University Press, Karachi 2006
17. Selected Stories of Saadat Hasan Manto, Penguin Modern Classics, New Delhi (2007)
18. Stop Press by Inam Aziz, Oxford University Press, Karachi (2007)
19. Bitter Fruit, The best of Saadat Hasan Manto, Penguin, New Delhi (2008)

== See also ==
- List of Pakistani journalists
