= 1975 Azad Kashmiri general election =

1975 Azad Kashmir general election
- 1970
	First party	Second party	Third party
Party	PPP	PML(N)	MC
Seats won	24	10	4
	Fourth party	Fifth party
Party	Jamaat-i-Islami	Independents
Seats won	1	2

General elections were held in Azad Kashmir in 1975 to elect the members of second assembly of Azad Kashmir.
