= Sahibzada Muhammad Ishaq Zaffar =

Pakistani politician

- صاحبزادہ محمد اسحاق ظفر
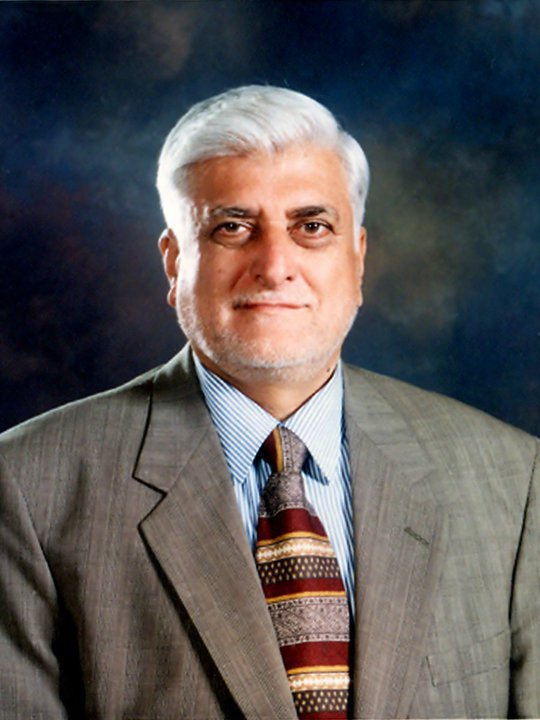

President of Azad Kashmir
- In office 20 July 1991 – 29 July 1991
- Preceded by: Muhammad Abdul Qayyum Khan
- Succeeded by: Abdul Rashid Abbasi

Speaker of the Azad Kashmir Legislative Assembly
- In office 29 June 1990 – 29 July 1991
- Preceded by: Mohammad Ayub Khan
- Succeeded by: Abdul Rashid Abbasi

Personal details
- Born: 19 April 1944 Bani Hafiz, Azad Kashmir, Pakistan
- Died: 2 September 2006 (aged 62) Rawalpindi, Punjab, Pakistan

Sahibzada Muhammad Ishaq Zaffar (Urdu: صاحبزادہ محمد اسحاق ظفر) also known as Ishaq Zaffar (1944–2006) was a Pakistani politician in Azad Kashmir administrative territory. He filled various positions in the Azad Kashmir government from the 1970s until his death while in office in 2006, beginning as a member of the Pakistan People's Party, serving as member of the Azad Kashmir Legislative Assembly, Speaker of the Assembly, Acting President of Azad Kashmir, and senior minister, and was opposition leader in the constituent assembly at the time of his death. He contested elections for constituent assembly of Azad Kashmir for five times and always won assembly seat.

== Early life ==
Born on 19 April 1944 in Bani Hafiz, a village of Hattian Bala, Azad Kashmir. Zaffar belonged to the spiritual family of Bani Hafiz, Hattian Bala which produced saints and spiritual leaders which are quite well known in the locality. His father's name was Hafiz Abdul Latif. Hafiz Jamal ud din was his great-grandfather. Hafiz Abdul Qudoos was his uncle. Zaffar was born an orphan, and raised by his uncle Hafiz Mian Muhammad Yunus, a local Sufi saint whose tomb is now a shrine in the village.

== Education ==
Zaffar matriculated from Chikar Tehsil of Muzaffarabad (now in Hattian Bala) and then went to Karachi to study law. He also earned his master's degree in political science and Urdu from Karachi University.

== Political life ==
Before entering politics he was a primary school teacher. Zaffar left the government teaching job and joined Zulfiqar Ali Bhutto's Pakistan Peoples Party (PPP) in the early 1970s. He was among the founding members of party Pakistan Peoples Party in Azad Kashmir. Zaffar was a law graduate, and remained bar president of Muzaffarabad Bar. Zaffar was a supporter of Bhuttos and he almost spent 30 months in jail for opposition to Zia ul Haq and Pervez Musharraf regimes. During the martial law in Pakistan he remained vocal for restoration of democracy in Pakistan under the banner of Alliance for Restoration of Democracy (ARD).

He was considered among the members of the party which were close to Benazir Bhutto. He remained as president of Pakistan peoples party AJK and was member of central executive committee He accompanied Benazir Bhutto to rallies and election campaigns. He was very good orator even Benazir Bhutto appreciated his quality of speaking. He represented Azad Kashmir Government in the United Nations regarding the Kashmir conflict.

During many up and downs Ishaq Zaffar remained steadfast to Pakistan Peoples Party.From 1996 to 2001, he was senior minister in Barrister Sultan Mahmood's led PP government. He always supported the continuation of parliamentary mechanism and improvement through it .

In July 2004 he was made president of Bhutto's PPP Azad Jammu and Kashmir. Despite zaffar's loyalty to the Party and supporting Barrister Sultan Mehmood in 1995 as president of party, Sultan did not accept Zaffar as president of party and formed his party Pakistan Peoples Muslim League Finally in 2006 Azad Kashmir elections, in an important step Mushraff granted his imprimatur and manipulated results For Sardar Mohammad Abdul Qayyum Khan's son, Sardar Attique to become Azad Kashmir's Prime minister and Zaffar was defeated as the prime minister candidate. Zaffar was appointed Opposition leader of AJ&K constituent Assembly in 2006 July.

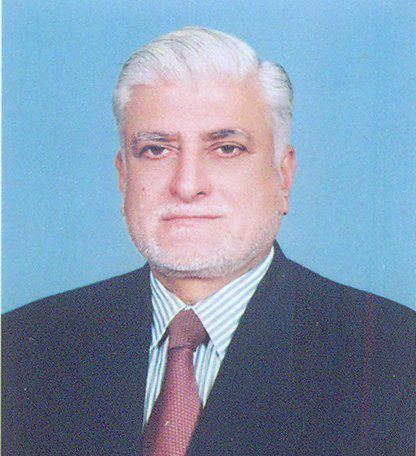
He was cherished by friends and equally by his political opponents for efficiently handling most complex situations for the government at the floor of the assembly and outside.

== Designations ==
- President Azad Jammu and Kashmir (acting), 20–29 July 1991.
- Speaker of AJ&K Legislative Assembly, 1990–1991
- Senior minister 1996-2001
- Opposition leader July to September 2006
- He also headed Bhutto's Pakistan Peoples Party Azad Kashmir. He was member of CEC of Pakistan peoples party from 1993 to 2006

== Family ==
Ishaq Zaffar's cousin Sahibzada Irfan Danish also remained MLA from 1990 to 1991. Hafiz Muhammad Shafi cousin of Ishaq Zaffar is among the spiritual personalities of vicinity. Zaffar's sister professor Anwar Kausar was a famous educationist and poet of merit. Zaffar married twice, he had 7 sons and 6 daughters; among them some held prominent seats Nargis Zaffar his daughter remained member of Punjab Assembly Pakistan from 2008 to 2013.Ashfaq Zaffar his son is senior vice president of PPP AJK and head of prime minister implementation committee(2012-2016). Food Minister of Azad Jammu and Kashmir (AJK) Javed Iqbal Budhanvi is his son in law.

== Death ==
Zaffar died of a heart attack on 2 September 2006 at Rawalpindi. After his death, Zaffar's eldest son Ashfaq continued the family's political career by contesting election on his vacant seat.

== Legacy ==
Zaffar was considered to be among the fair politician of AJK, even his political opponents such as Farooq Haider Khan, Attique Ahmed Khan and Sultan Mehmood Chaudhry appreciate his contributions to politics and people of AJK.

Though a member of Azad Kashmir's majority Gujjar community, Zaffar was respected for his neutrality and meritocracy and there were no allegations of corruption against him over his four-decade political career.
