= Raja Mumtaz Hussain Rathore =

Former prime minister of Azad Kashmir

- راجہ ممتاز حسین راٹھور
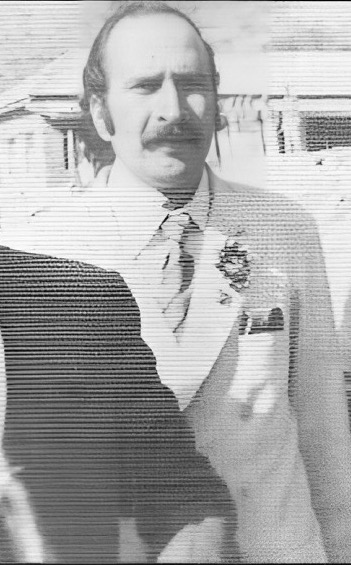

Prime Minister of Azad Kashmir
- In office 29 June 1990 – 5 July 1991
- Preceded by: Sardar Sikandar Hayat
- Succeeded by: Abdul Qayyum Khan

Personal details
- Born: 26 June 1943 Haveli District, Jammu and Kashmir, British India
- Died: 16 June 1999 (aged 55) Rawalpindi, Punjab, Pakistan
- Party: All Jammu and Kashmir Muslim Conference
- Other political affiliations: Pakistan People's Party
- Children: Faisal Mumtaz Rathore (son)

Raja Mumtaz Hussain Rathore (Pahari-Pothwari: راجہ ممتاز حسین راٹھور) was an Azad Kashmiri politician. He served as Prime Minister of Azad Kashmir from 29 June 1990 to 5 July 1991.

== Jammu and Kashmir National Student Federation ==
He was born into a wealthy landowning Rathore Muslim Rajput family in the Haveli District located today in Azad Kashmir. As a student he founded the Jammu Kashmir National Student Federation and, upon completing his education, became a lawyer. In 1970, he ran for his first election as a candidate for the Muslim Conference, and became an AJK Assembly member for Upper Haveli. He also joined the Freedom Movement political party (Tehreek-e-Azadi).

== Political career ==
At the suggestion of Zulfikar Ali Bhutto, he joined Bhutto's Pakistan People's Party (PPP). In 1975 he was elected as a PPP candidate and became the senior minister of Abdul Hamid Khan's PPP-led government. Portfolios held thereafter included finance, forests and revenue minister. He won five consecutive elections. He also served as governor of Khuiratta for a brief period.

Rathore was elected prime minister under the fourth Assembly in May 1990 with his tenure officially starting on 29 June. He served as prime minister until 1991, when he was ousted and arrested after accusing Nawaz Sharif of rigging the state election. Rathore annulled the results and called for new elections to be held, resulting in the Pakistani government proclaiming his actions illegal and removing him from the office. His arrest lead to protests in Azad Kashmir and he was released after a few days. His political career continued and, after his tenure as prime minister ended, Rathore lead nearly 2,000 constituents in a protest march to the Azad Kashmiri capital Muzaffarabad in 1993. He was arrested, allegedly along with many other protesters. Afterward, Rathore was elected the Speaker of the Assembly on 30 July 1996. In June 1998, he was ousted from the speakership after a successful vote of no confidence.

== Death ==
Raja Mumtaz Hussain Rathore died of heart failure on 16 June 1999 after being taken to a hospital in Rawalpindi. He was buried in the same graveyard as his mother in his native town Pullangi (District Haveli). Each year on 20 May, a memorial is held in his memory, attended by state and national leadership in his hometown. His son Faisal Mumtaz Rathore is currently serving as the prime minister of AJK from the PPP.
