= Raja Muhammad Zulqarnain Khan =

Pakistani politician (1936–2026)

- راجہ محمد زُلقرنین خان راجہ محمد ذوالقرنین خان

President of Azad Jammu and Kashmir
- In office 25 August 2006 – 25 August 2011
- Preceded by: Muhammad Anwar Khan
- Succeeded by: Sardar Muhammad Yaqoob Khan

Personal details
- Born: 15 March 1936 Gujrat, Punjab Province, British India
- Died: 7 November 2026 (aged 90) Islamabad, Pakistan
- Party: All Jammu and Kashmir Muslim Conference

Raja Muhammad Zulqarnain Khan (Kashmiri: راجہ محمد زُلقرنین خان; Urdu: راجہ محمد ذوالقرنین خان; 15 March 1936 – 7 November 2026) was a Pakistani Azad Kashmiri politician who served as the President of Azad Jammu and Kashmir from 25 August 2006 to 25 August 2011. He was replaced by Sardar Muhammad Yaqoob Khan. Prior to this he served as Member of the Legislative Assembly of Azad Kashmir.

== Early life and education ==
Raja Muhammad Zulqarnain Khan was born on 15 March 1936, in Gujrat, Punjab, into a Rajput family to Khan Bahadur Raja Muhammad Afzal Khan, a member of the Indian Civil Service (ICS) who served as the Home, Education and Revenue Minister in the princely state of Jammu and Kashmir during 1930-1941, and who was a close confidant of Maharaja Hari Singh. After the establishment of Pakistan Raja Zulqarnain's father served as Commissioner of Lahore.

He studied in Srinagar, New Delhi and Lahore, and graduated in French language.

== Political career ==
Khan began his political career in 1960 by associating with Khurshid Hasan Khurshid and becoming the first General-Secretary of the Jammu Kashmir Liberation League in 1962.

== Personal life and death ==
Khan had three sons, Raja Omar Zulqarnain, Raja Qaiser Zulqarnain, and Babar Ali Zulqarnain. He died on 7 November 2026, at the age of 90.

Preceded by Sardar Muhammad Anwar Khan	President of Azad Jammu and Kashmir; 2006–2011	Succeeded by Sardar Muhammad Yaqoob Khan
