= Tain A.K =

- Town and union council
- Country: Pakistan
- Time zone: UTC+5 (PST)

Tain is a union council situated between Thorar and Pachiot.

== Notable people ==
- Muhammad Anwar Khan, the former president of Azad Kashmir
