= Abdul Rahman Khan (Azad Kashmiri politician) =

Interim president of Azad Kashmir, Pakistan

President of Azad Jammu and Kashmir
- In office 1 February 1983 – 1 October 1985
- Preceded by: Brigadier Muhammad Hayat Khan
- Succeeded by: Sardar Mohammad Abdul Qayyum Khan
- In office 7 October 1969 – 30 October 1970
- Preceded by: Abdul Hamid Khan
- Succeeded by: Sardar Mohammad Abdul Qayyum Khan

Abdul Rahman Khan was a politician from Azad Kashmir,i who served as the interim President of Azad Kashmir from 7 October 1969 to 30 October 1970, and again from 1983 to 1985.
