= Khurshid Hasan Khurshid =

President of Azad Jammu and Kashmir from 1959 to 1964

- خورشید حسن خورشید
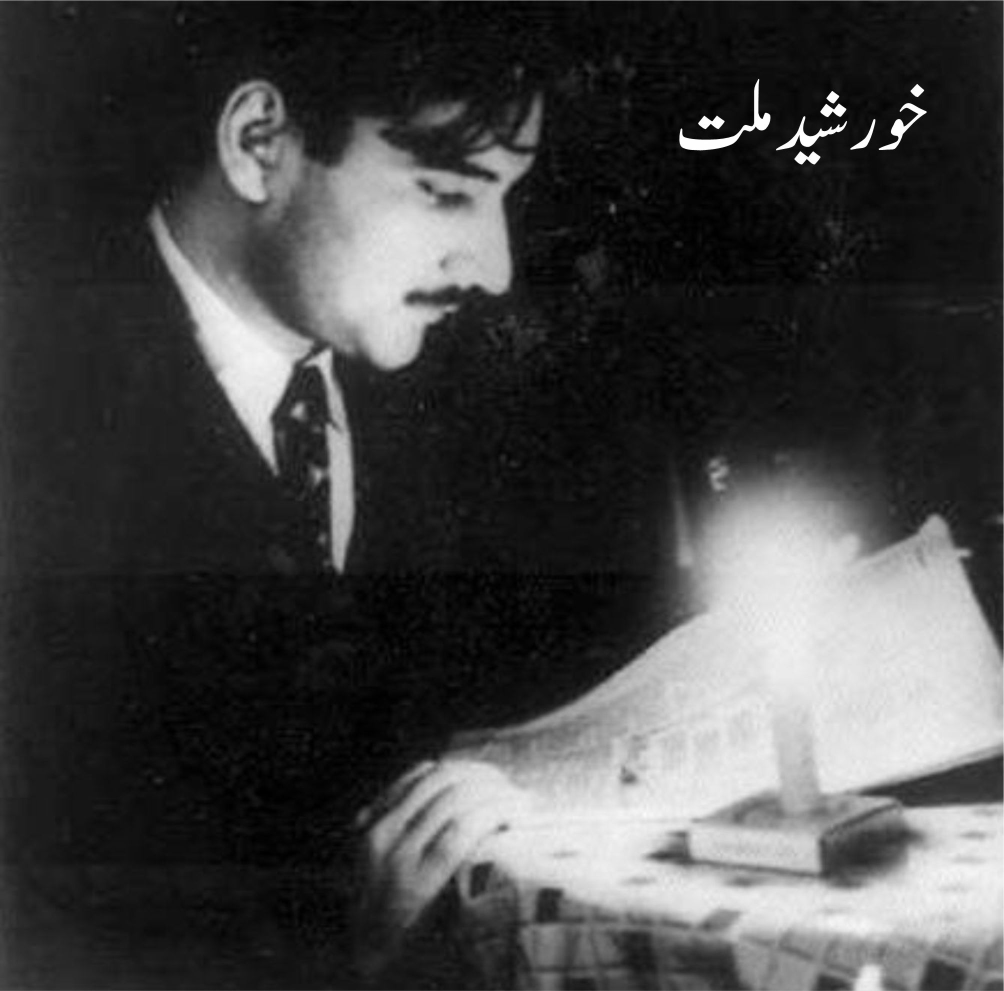

President of Azad Kashmir
- In office 1 May 1959 – 7 August 1964
- Preceded by: Sardar Ibrahim Khan
- Succeeded by: Abdul Hamid Khan

Private Secretary of Muhammad Ali Jinnah
- In office May 1944 – 11 September 1948
- Preceded by: Office established
- Succeeded by: Office abolished

Personal details
- Born: 3 January 1924 Srinagar, Jammu and Kashmir, British India
- Died: 11 March 1988 (aged 64) Lahore, Punjab, Pakistan
- Resting place: Khurshid Hasan Khurshid Mausoleum, Muzaffarabad, Azad Kashmir, Pakistan
- Party: Jammu and Kashmir Liberation League
- Spouse: Begum Surayya Khurshid
- Relatives: Khalid Hasan, Fawad Hasan Fawad (Brothers-in-Law)
- Education: Amar Singh College
- Occupation: Journalist, Private secretary, Politician

Khurshid Hasan Khurshid (Urdu: خورشید حسن خورشید) pronounced [xu:r'ʃi:d ɦəsəɳ xu:r'ʃi:d], popularly known by his acronym, K. H. Khurshid, (3 January 1924 – 11 March 1988) was the Private Secretary of Muhammad Ali Jinnah, the first Governor-General of Pakistan. He served Jinnah from 1944 until his death in 1948. Khurshid was the first elected President of Azad Jammu and Kashmir from 1959 to 1964. He was also the instigator of the Constitution of Azad Kashmir.

Khurshid was sent by Jinnah to Jammu and Kashmir in October 1947 shortly before the tribal invasion. He was arrested by Indian forces and jailed in Srinagar and finally repatriated to Pakistan in a prisoner exchange in 1949. Khurshid often wrote his name as simply "Khurshid", which was both his first name and last name. Indian sources often mistakenly write it as "Khurshid Ahmed".

== Early life ==
Khurshid was born in Srinagar on 3 January 1924. His father was Maulvi Mohammad Hasan, a headmaster of a boys' school in Gilgit. Consequently, the early years of Khurshid's life were spent in Gilgit. He completed a bachelor's degree from the Amar Singh College in Srinagar. During his college years, he established Kashmir Muslim Students Federation and met Mohammad Ali Jinnah in Jalandhar for the first time in 1942. Khurshid also wrote for the weekly Javed started by the Muslim Conference leader Allah Rakha Sagar.

Later he started working for the news agency Orient Press of India in Srinagar. When Jinnah went to Srinagar for a holiday in May 1944, Khurshid interacted with him as an agent of the Orient Press. Jinnah was impressed with him and hired him on his staff. Khurshid subsequently rose to be Jinnah's private secretary and watched the troubled political waters leading to the Partition of India from close quarters.

Khurshid was married to Begum Sorayya, a confidante of Fatimah Jinnah and the author of Memories of Fatimah Jinnah. She was the sister of journalist Khalid Hasan.

== Missions to Kashmir ==
Jinnah sent Khurshid on a mission to Kashmir in the summer of 1947. Jinnah wanted to holiday in Kashmir at this time but, given the pressure on him to accede to one of the incoming dominions, the Maharajah Hari Singh was no mood to entertain the request. Khurshid reportedly told the Maharajah that he was an independent sovereign and need not consult anybody regarding the accession of the state. If he acceded to Pakistan, he would not have to delegate any of his powers to Sheikh Abdullah. "Pakistan would not touch a hair of his head or take an iota of his powers." Scholar Das Gupta also states that Khurshid stayed there for several months and created an atmosphere of communal frenzy against India.

At the beginning of October 1947, Jinnah sent him to Kashmir again. The Maharajah had appointed Justice Mehr Chand Mahajan, with known connections to the Indian National Congress, as his prime minister, replacing the pro-Pakistan Ram Chandra Kak. Jinnah wanted to find out Maharajah's intentions. Khurshid reported back on 12 October stating that the Maharajah was "dead set against accession to Pakistan". He also reported that the pro-India National Conference was the only party in the state. The pro-Pakistan Muslim Conference was "essentially defunct". He concluded:

"In the light of the above, I am personally of the opinion, Sir, that Pakistan must think in terms of fighting . . . as far as Kashmir is concerned.... All that Pakistan has to be ready for in such an eventuality is to supply arms and foodstuffs to the tribes within and without the State who are already sharpening their weapons.... I may say, Sir, that Major Khurshid Anwar (of Muslim [League] National Guards) is already in Rawalpindi and he can very well be trusted with the work of liaison."

In fact, Major Khurshid Anwar had already mobilised the Pashtun tribes from the Frontier for a raid on Kashmir and was poised to launch his attack on 15 October. When the tribal invasion was launched on 22 October 1947, Khurshid was still in the Valley. He was arrested on 2 November 1947 by the State Police, who recovered maps and documents from him. Indian sources say that Khurshid had gone underground and was attempting to organise an agitation against the state government from the Jama Masjid, the hub of activity for the Muslim Conference. Khurshid remained in custody until a prisoner exchange in 1949, after the Karachi Agreement was signed by India and Pakistan.

== Azad Kashmir politics ==
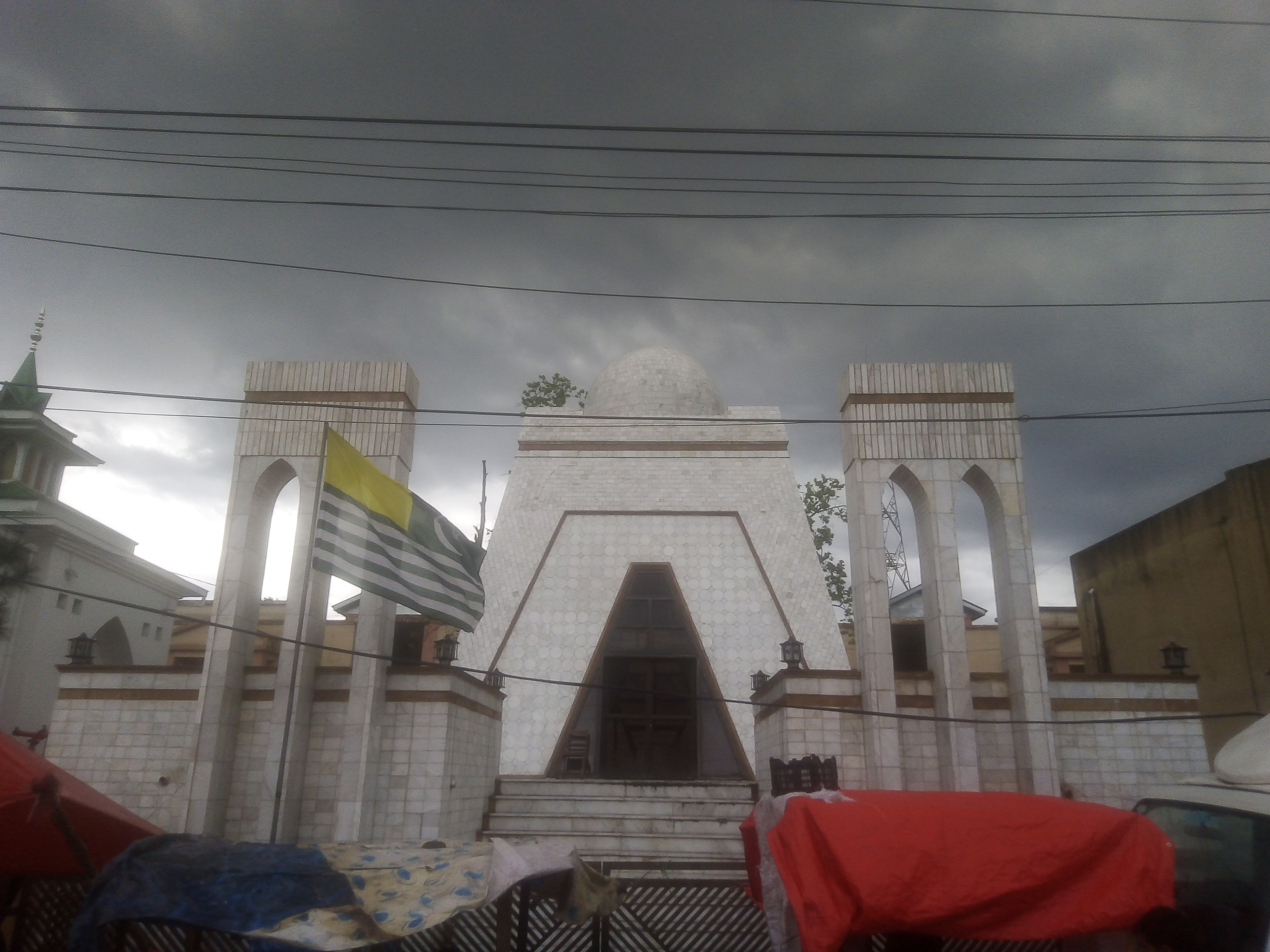
Muzaffarabad city

K. H. Khurshid was appointed President of Azad Kashmir on 1 May 1959 by Ayub Khan. He was, at first, reluctant to accept this office, but eventually did so at the insistence of Fatima Jinnah who is said to have treated him as her son and had also financially supported him to earn the bar-at-law degree from Lincoln's Inn. As President, K. H. Khurshid conducted the first ever 'Basic Democracy' elections in Azad Kashmir and also won in this election as the President of Azad Kashmir. According to Dawn, "following some differences with the powerful Pakistani establishment, Mr Khurshid resigned from the office of AJK president on August 5, 1964."

== Death and legacy ==
"K. H. Khurshid died in a road accident on 11 March 1988, while travelling in a public transport vehicle as an ordinary passenger." He was buried in Muzaffarabad, Azad Kashmir. Kashmiri masses regarded him as an icon of honesty, integrity and democracy. Mr. Jinnah was once believed to have said that Pakistan was made by him, his private secretary and his typewriter.

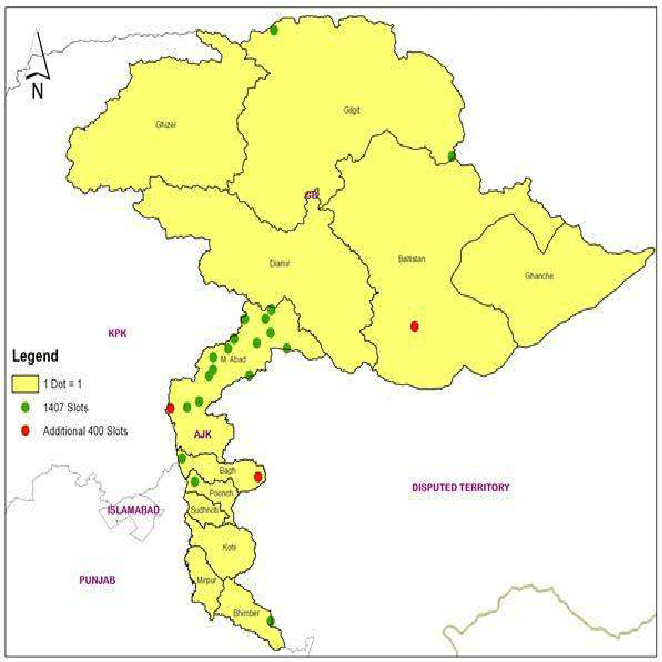
gb ajk

== Bibliography ==
- Bajwa, Kuldip Singh (2003), Jammu and Kashmir War, 1947–1948: Political and Military Perspective, Har-Anand Publications, ISBN 978-81-241-0923-6
- Cheema, Brig Amar (2015), The Crimson Chinar: The Kashmir Conflict: A Politico Military Perspective, Lancer Publishers, pp. 51–, ISBN 978-81-7062-301-4
- Das Gupta, Jyoti Bhusan (2012), Jammu and Kashmir, Springer, ISBN 978-94-011-9231-6
- Hajari, Nisid (2015), Midnight's Furies: The Deadly Legacy of India's Partition, Houghton Mifflin Harcourt, pp. 185–, ISBN 978-0-547-66924-3
- Khurshid, K. H.; Hasan, Khālid (1990), Memories of Jinnah, Oxford University Press, ISBN 978-0-19-577406-1
- Saraf, Muhammad Yusuf (2015) [first published 1979 by Ferozsons], Kashmiris Fight for Freedom, Volume 2, Mirpur: National Institute Kashmir Studies
- Snedden, Christopher (2013) [first published as The Untold Story of the People of Azad Kashmir, 2012], Kashmir: The Unwritten History, HarperCollins India, ISBN 978-9350298985
