= Muhammad Anwar Khan (Azad Kashmir politician) =

Pakistani general

Major General Muhammad Anwar Khan

President of Azad Jammu and Kashmir
- In office 25 August 2001 – 25 August 2006
- Preceded by: Sardar Muhammad Ibrahim Khan
- Succeeded by: Raja Muhammad Zulqarnain Khan

Colonel Commandant Azad Kashmir Regiment
- In office November 1999 – July 2001
- Preceded by: Muhammad Saleem Arshad
- Succeeded by: Javed Hassan

Personal details
- Born: 9 May 1945 Tain, Jammu and Kashmir
- Died: 19 January 2023 (aged 77) Rawalpindi, Pakistan
- Children: 5, including Brigadier Adnan Anwar
- Education: Pakistan Command and Staff College; Pakistan Naval War College; National Defence University; United States Army War College

Military service
- Allegiance: Pakistan
- Branch/service: Pakistan Air Force; Pakistan Army
- Years of service: 1963-2001
- Major General: Major General
- Unit: 7 Azad Kashmir Regiment
- Commands: 7 Azad Kashmir Regiment; GOC 11th Infantry Division, Lahore; GOC 8th Infantry Division, Sialkot; Vice Chief of General Staff, Rawalpindi
- Battles/wars: Indo-Pakistani War of 1971
- Service number: PA-66705

Muhammad Anwar Khan (9 May 1945 – 19 January 2023) was a Pakistan Army general and politician who served as the President of Azad Kashmir from 25 August 2001 to 23 August 2006. He belonged to a Sudhan family.

Khan served on various command and staff appointments that included VCGS, GOC of Lahore, and GOC of Sialkot.

== Education and career ==
Sardar Anwar Khan received his early education from Tain and then got recruited in the Pakistan Air Force on 7 January 1963 and was allotted the service number PA-66705. He served the air force until October 1966 when he was then selected for commission in the Pakistan Army. On 15 April 1967, he was commissioned in the Azad Kashmir Regiment. He is a graduate of the Command and Staff College, Quetta, Pakistan Navy Staff College, Karachi and National Defence College, Rawalpindi. He also attended the U.S. Army War College in Pennsylvania and received a Master's Degree in War Studies.

During a span of 35 years of his distinguished army career, he held various important commands of staff and instructional appointments. He commanded two infantry battalions, a brigade and as Major General commanded two infantry divisions. As a young officer he also actively participated in 1971 war in the Kashmir sector. He made significant contribution to the leadership development within the Pakistan Army as an Instructor at the Pakistan Military Academy, School of Infantry and Tactics, Command and Staff College, Quetta and as the Chief Instructor at National Defence College, Islamabad from December 1996 to December 1998. He retired from the army as Vice Chief of General Staff (VCGS) in July 2001. He also served as the colonel commandant of Azad Kashmir Regiment till April 2003.

== Personal life and death ==
He was married and had three sons and two daughters. His son, Brigadier Adnan Anwar is currently serving in the Pakistan Army. His personal efforts to bring Army Public School in his native village of Tain brought useful results in 2021 when APS Tain started its educational functionality.

He died on 19 January 2023 and his funeral was held in Army Race Course Graveyard on 20 January 2023. Many officials from the Pakistan Army attended his funeral.

| Preceded by Sardar Muhammad Ibrahim Khan | President of Azad Jammu and Kashmir; 2001–2006 | Succeeded by Raja Muhammad Zulqarnain Khan |
