= Abdul Hamid Khan (Azad Kashmiri politician) =

Pakistani politician (born 1907)

- عبدالحمید خان

Prime Minister of Azad Kashmir
- In office 5 July 1975 – 31 August 1977
- Preceded by: Office established
- Succeeded by: Sardar Sikdandar Hayat

President of Azad Kashmir
- In office 7 August 1964 – 7 October 1969
- Preceded by: Khurshid Hasan Khurshid
- Succeeded by: Abdul Rahman Khan (interim)

Chief Justice of High Court of Azad Kashmir
- In office 1 October 1963 – 13 October 1964
- Preceded by: Fayyaz Hussain Shah
- Succeeded by: Khwaja Muhammad Sharif

Personal details
- Born: 15 October 1907
- Party: Independent
- Relations: Abdul Majid Khan (grandson)

Khan Abdul Hamid Khan (Urdu: خان عبدالحمید خان, pronounced [xa:ɳ əbdʊl ɦəm'i:d xa:ɳ], born 15 October 1907, date of death unknown) was a Pakistani Azad Kashmiri politician and jurist who served as the 1st Prime Minister of Azad Kashmir from 1 June 1975 to 31 August 1977. He was succeeded by late Sikandar Hayat Khan (June 1985 to June 1990). He also served as President of Azad Jammu and Kashmir from 7 August 1964 to 7 October 1969.

Khan's older brother, Abdul Qayyum Khan, was a well known Pakistani politician who served as the Chief Minister of Khyber Pakhtunkhwa and Interior Minister of Pakistan. He belonged to the Kashmiri Lone Family and originally hailed from Baramaulla.
