= Khuiratta Tehsil =

Tehsil in Azad Kashmir, Pakistan

Khuiratta کھوئی رٹہ Khuiratta
- Location within Azad Kashmir Location within Pakistan
- Coordinates: 33.360°N 74.027°E
- Country: Pakistan
- State: Azad Kashmir
- District: Kotli

Government
  - [UCs]: 05

Population (2017)
  - Total: 8,220
- Time zone: UTC+5 (PST)
- Postal Code: 11200
- Area code: 0092-5826
- Website: District Website

Khuiratta (Urdu: کھوئی رٹہ) is a tehsil of Kotli District in Azad Kashmir, a part of Kashmir administered by Pakistan.
