= Sardar Ibrahim Khan =

Former president of Azad Kashmir (1915–2003)

Sardar Ibrahim Khan Ghazi-e-Millat
- ابراہیم خان
- Khan in his office in 1948

President of Azad Kashmir
- In office 25 August 1996 – 25 August 2001
- Preceded by: Abdul Rashid Abbasi (interim)
- Succeeded by: Sardar Anwar Khan
- In office 5 June 1975 – 30 October 1978
- Preceded by: Sardar Abdul Qayyum
- Succeeded by: Muhammad Hayat Khan
- In office 13 April 1957 – 30 April 1959
- Preceded by: Sardar Abdul Qayyum
- Succeeded by: Khurshid Hasan Khurshid
- In office 24 October 1947 – 12 May 1950
- Preceded by: Office established
- Succeeded by: Ali Ahmed Shah

Personal details
- Born: 10 April 1915 Kot Mattay Khan, Poonch district, Jammu and Kashmir, British India
- Died: 31 July 2003 (aged 88) Islamabad, Pakistan
- Resting place: Mausoleum of Sardar Ibrahim Khan, Kot Mattay Khan, Poonch District, Azad Kashmir, Pakistan
- Party: Muslim Conference; Jammu Kashmir Peoples Party
- Spouse: Zaib-un-Nisa Khan
- Relations: Sardar Jawaid Ibrahim Khan (Son); Sardar Khalid Ibrahim Khan (Son) (MLA); Uft-e-Huma (Daughter); Sardar Farooq Ibrahim Khan (Son); Noreen Farooq Khan (Daughter-In-Law) (MNA); Masood Khan (grand nephew)
- Education: Government Islamia College; University of London; Lincoln's Inn
- Profession: Lawyer • Politician

Sardar Ibrahim Khan (Note: Urdu: سردار ابراہیم خان, pronounced [sər'da:r ɪbra:'ɦi:m xa:n]) (22 April 1915 – 31 July 2003) was a revolutionary leader and politician from the western region of Jammu and Kashmir (present-day Azad Kashmir), who led the 1947 Poonch Rebellion against the Maharaja in the state of Jammu and Kashmir and played a key role in the First Kashmir War, supporting Pakistan. He served as the President of Azad Kashmir for 13 years across four non-consecutive terms and still remains the longest-serving president of the state, since its establishment.

He is revered as Ghazi-e-Millat (Warrior of the Nation) in Azad Kashmir. Due to his services to Kashmir freedom struggle, he is known among the people of Kashmir as: Bani-e-Kashmir ("Founding president of Azad Kashmir").

== Early life and education ==
Sardar Ibrahim Khan was born on 22 April 1915 in Kot Mattay Khan, a village in the Poonch District of Kashmir to an elite Sudhan family. He received his primary education in his village. He attended college and received a Bachelors of Arts degree in 1937 at Islamia College (Lahore) and sought higher education abroad in 1938. He went to the UK in 1939 and obtained his LLB degree from the University of London in 1941. Khan then obtained a law degree from Lincoln's Inn, and later started practicing law at Srinagar, Kashmir.

== Career ==
=== 1947 Poonch rebellion ===
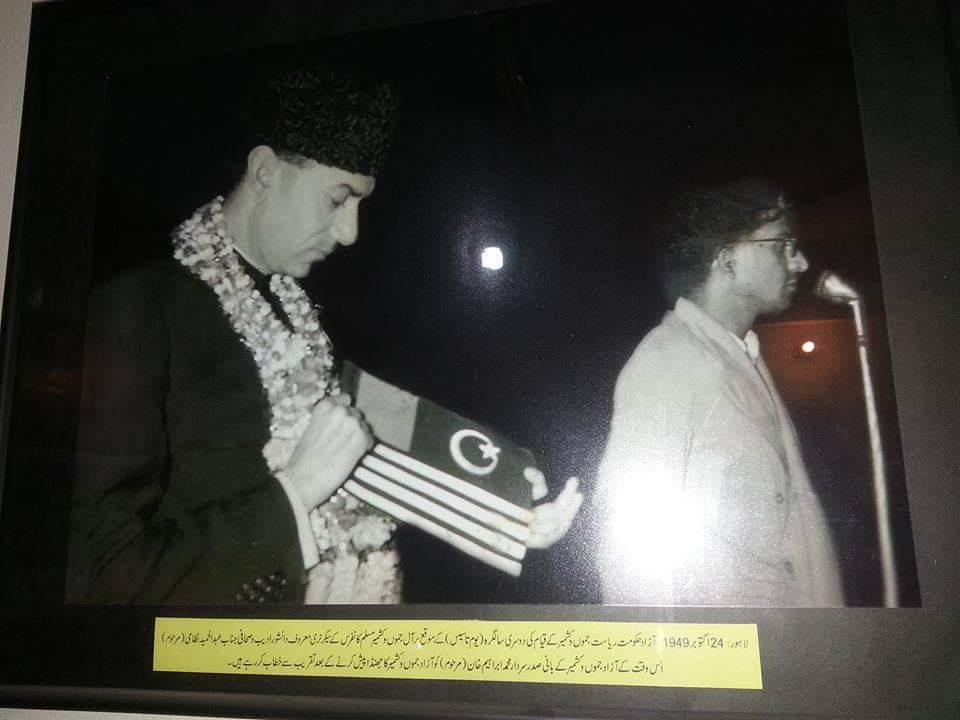
Sardar Ibrahim Khan holding the Flag of Azad Kashmir

Ibrahim Khan played a pivotal role in the initiative of the 1947 Poonch rebellion and the First Kashmir War. In British India of 1946, he won the Jammu and Kashmir State Assembly election as a member of the Muslim Conference party and became a member of the Praja Sabha under Maharajah Hari Singh, Jammu and Kashmir ruler. This ruler signed a 'stand-still agreement' with the newly created state of Pakistan as a result of the Indian Independence Act 1947 which resulted in the Partition of India into India and Pakistan following the end of British rule in the Indian subcontinent. In 1947, Ibrahim Khan instigated and organised the Poonch rebellion, and with support from the Muslim League, planned and helped in the invasion and liberation of Jammu and Kashmir. He organised the rebellion through the use of former British Indian Army soldiers of the Muslim population who had kept their weapons after the war and were heavily armed. Muslim Kashmiri leaders saw it as a liberation of Muslim-majority Kashmir from the Hindu ruler.

On 19 July 1947, Khan held a general assembly meeting at his residence where a resolution was unanimously passed for the State of Kashmir to join Pakistan. The Maharaja, Hari Singh, disapproved of his actions, and Khan left the state and went to Murree, Pakistan. In Murree, he gathered ammunition from private individuals and organizations. With several fellow Kashmiris, he launched a ‘Jihad’ against the Maharaja. On 24 October 1947, he defeated the forces of the Maharaja in the Poonch rebellion and founded the state of Azad Kashmir, which became a self-governing division of Pakistan.

After fighting the Indian Army for 15 months, the Azad Kashmir militia accepted a United Nations-mediated ceasefire. Khan and his army were able to capture substantial portions of the three western districts of Kashmir, which were renamed Azad Kashmir (Free Kashmir).

Khan was appointed the first President of Azad Kashmir in 1948 by Pakistan. He represented Kashmir in different capacities at the United Nations from 1948 to 1971.

Sardar Muhammad Ibrahim Khan also wrote a book named The Kashmir Saga on government and politics of Azad Kashmir and included the history and philosophy of freedom struggle in the book.

=== 1955 Poonch uprising ===
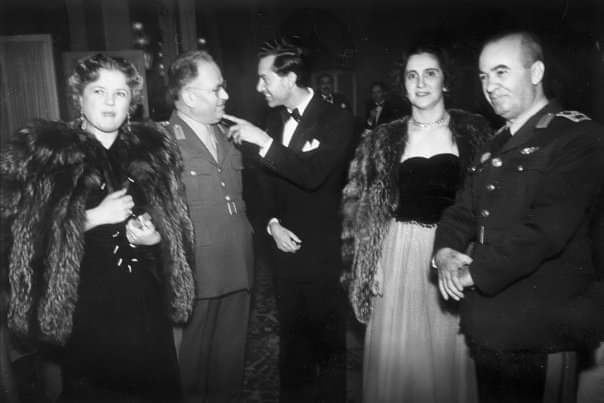
Sardar Ibrahim Khan with British officers in 1953

Khan's dismissal is widely regarded as the trigger to the 1955 uprising in Poonch Division.

=== Professional and political career ===
Under the Maharajah's rule in 1943, Khan was appointed a public prosecutor in Mirpur. He later worked at the State Advocate General office of Jammu and Kashmir. Then he left the government job to participate in the Kashmir Freedom Movement and won the 1946 Jammu and Kashmir State Assembly elections. He went on to serve three more terms in office until August 2001. He retired at the age of 86. He also established the Azad Muslim Conference.

=== President of Azad Kashmir ===
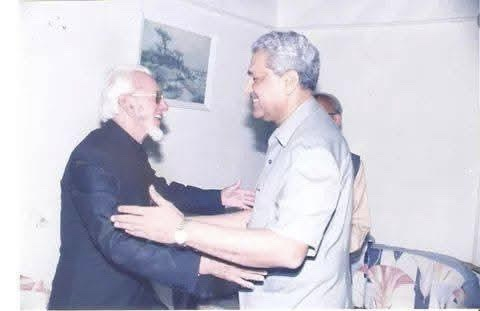
Founder of AJK Sardar Ibrahim With Pakistani nuclear scientist, Dr. Abdul Qadir Khan

As the first self-proclaimed President of Azad Kashmir, he was invited by the United Nations to brief the General assembly on the situation in Kashmir. Under the leadership of Khan, the annual session of the All Jammu and Kashmir Muslim Conference was held at Kotli in 1954, and a resolution was passed for the establishment of a proper Legislative Assembly in Azad Kashmir. While he and his lieutenants continued to push for a legislative assembly, it was not until the presidency of General Yahya Khan in 1969 that the Azad Kashmir Legislative Assembly was formed. Khan was elected as president of Azad Kashmir for the second time on 13 April 1957 and for the third time on 5 June 1975. Sardar Ibrahim was very close to Zulfiqar Ali Bhutto and had formed the Azad Kashmir chapter of the Pakistan Peoples Party. In 1977, General Zia ul-Haq dissolved Bhutto's government, and offered to allow Khan to continue as president as long as he stopped supporting Bhutto. Khan refused to betray Bhutto, resulting in the termination of his presidency through a proclamation issued by General Zia Ul-Haq, the Chairman of Azad Jammu and Kashmir Council, on 30 October 1978. Khan, however, was elected again as the President of Azad Kashmir in August 1996. He remained in office until August 2001 and was the Azad Kashmir president four times in his lifetime.

== Death and legacy ==
Sardar Muhammad Ibrahim Khan died at his Islamabad home on 31 July 2003 after a long period of illness at the age of 88. President Pervez Musharraf and Prime Minister Zafarullah Khan Jamali paid tribute to him in their condolence messages.

Due to his services to Kashmir freedom struggle, he is known among the people of Kashmir as:

- Bani-e-Kashmir ("Founding president of AJK")
- Ghazi-e-Millat ("Hero of the Nation")

== Published works ==
His primary published works include:

- The Kashmir Saga (1965): His most prominent work, written in English, outlining the history of the region and the Poonch rebellion against Dogra rule.
- Mataa-e-Zindagi ("Achievement of Life", 1970s): An autobiography in Urdu reflecting on his early life, political career, and the freedom movement.

Political offices
Preceded by Post Created	President of Azad Jammu and Kashmir; 1948–1950	Succeeded by Captain Syed Ali Ahmed Shah
Preceded by Dost Muhammad Khosa	2nd term 1957–1959	Succeeded by Khurshid Hassan Khurshid
Preceded by Sardar Mohammad Abdul Qayyum Khan	3rd term 1975–1978	Succeeded by Muhammad Hayat Khan
Preceded by Sardar Sikandar Hayat Khan	4th term 1996–2001	Succeeded by Sardar Muhammad Anwar Khan
