= Sultan Mehmood Chaudhry =

Pakistani-Kashmiri politician (1950/1951–2026)

Barrister Sultan Mehmood Chaudhry
- سلطان محمود چوہدری

President of Azad Kashmir
- In office 25 August 2021 – 31 January 2026
- Prime Minister: Abdul Qayyum Niazi; Sardar Tanveer Ilyas; Chaudhry Anwarul Haq; Faisal Mumtaz Rathore
- Preceded by: Masood Khan
- Succeeded by: Chaudhry Latif Akbar (acting)

Prime Minister of Azad Kashmir
- In office 30 July 1996 – 24 July 2001
- Preceded by: Abdul Qayyum Khan
- Succeeded by: Sardar Sikandar Hayat

President of Pakistan Tehreek-e-Insaf Azad Kashmir
- In office 6 February 2015 – 9 September 2021
- Chairman: Imran Khan
- Succeeded by: Sardar Tanveer Ilyas

Member of the Azad Jammu and Kashmir Legislative Assembly
- In office 3 August 2021 – 25 August 2021
- Preceded by: Himself
- Succeeded by: Yasir Sultan Chaudhry
- Constituency: LA-3 Mirpur-III
- In office 24 November 2019 – 30 July 2021
- Preceded by: Chaudhry Muhammad Saeed
- Succeeded by: Himself
- Constituency: LA-3 Mirpur-III
- In office 1996 – 25 July 2016
- Preceded by: Arshad Mahmood Ghazi
- Succeeded by: Chaudhry Muhammad Saeed
- Constituency: LA-3 Mirpur-III
- In office 1985–1991
- Preceded by: Chauhdry Noor Hussain
- Succeeded by: Arshad Mahmood Ghazi
- Constituency: LA-3 Mirpur-III

Personal details
- Born: 9 August 1955
- Died: 31 January 2026 (aged 70) Islamabad, Pakistan
- Party: PTI (2015–2026)
- Other political affiliations: PPP (2010–2015); Jammu and Kashmir People's Muslim League (2006–2010); PPP (1985-2006)
- Children: Yasir Sultan Chaudhry (son)
- Education: Lincoln's Inn Government Gordon College

Sultan Mehmood Chaudhry (Urdu: سلطان محمود چوہدری; 9 August 1955 – 31 January 2026) was an Azad Kashmiri politician who hailed from Mirpur. He served as Prime Minister of Azad Kashmir between July 1996 to July 2001 and served as the President of Azad Kashmir from 25 August 2021 until his death on 31 January 2026.

== Early life ==
Sultan Mehmood Chaudhry was born on 9 August 1955. He was the son of the late Kashmiri leader Chaudhary Noor Hussain who also founded Azad Muslim Conference along with Sardar Ibrahim Khan but after Sardar Ibrahim Khan left the party, he led it alone. He belonged to a Jatt family and his family had contributions in the movement for a free Jammu and Kashmir. He had also been a member of Azad Jammu and Kashmir Legislative Assembly.

== Political career ==
In the second elections in Azad Kashmir, Chaudhry Muhammad Rasheed, Chaudhry Khadim Hussain and Chaudhry Yasin won. Then Sultan Mehmood merged his party with the Liberation League and became its president. Later, he left that party and joined Pakistan People's Party and became president of its Azad Kashmir chapter. Then he became Prime Minister of Azad Jammu and Kashmir. He faced some problems in the PPP which led to him quitting the party. He then founded his own party People's Muslim League in 2005 and his party won 5 seats in the Legislative Assembly. Later, when Benazir Bhutto addressed the issue, he (Sultan Mehmood) apologised and was allowed to join the party again. He rejoined the Pakistan People's Party again but won no seats in the AJK Legislative Assembly.

Chaudhry joined Pakistan Tehreek-e-Insaf on 6 February 2015 and lost the elections for the first time in 25 years on 21 July 2016.

On 24 November 2019, he became a Member of the Azad Jammu and Kashmir Legislative Assembly in the by-elections in Mirpur.

He was elected as the President of Azad Kashmir on 17 August 2021.

== Death ==
On 31 January 2026, Chaudhry died in Islamabad at the age of 71 after a prolonged illness. The Government of Azad Jammu and Kashmir announced a three-day mourning over his death. He was given a state funeral with his funeral prayer offered at the Quaid-e-Azam Stadium in Mirpur, Azad Kashmir.
