= Abdul Rashid Abbasi =

Kashmiri Politician

Abdul Rashid Abbasi was an Azad Kashmiri politician who served as interim President of Azad Kashmir from 29 July 1991 to 12 August 1991.
