= Muhammad Abdul Qayyum Khan =

Azad Kashmir politician

Sardar Abdul Qayyum Khan
- سردار محمد عبد القیوم خان

President of Azad Kashmir
- In office 1 October 1985 – 20 July 1991
- Preceded by: Abdul Rahman Khan
- Succeeded by: Sahibzada Ishaq Zaffar (acting)
- In office 30 October 1970 – 16 April 1975
- Preceded by: Abdul Rahman Khan (acting)
- Succeeded by: Sardar Ibrahim Khan
- In office 8 September 1956 – 13 April 1957
- Preceded by: Mirwaiz Yusuf Shah
- Succeeded by: Sardar Ibrahim Khan

Prime Minister of Azad Kashmir
- In office 29 July 1991 – 29 July 1996
- Preceded by: Raja Mumtaz Hussain
- Succeeded by: Sultan Mehmood Chaudhry

Personal details
- Born: 4 April 1924 Ghaziabad, Poonch district, Jammu and Kashmir, British India
- Died: 10 July 2015 (aged 91) Rawalpindi, Punjab, Pakistan
- Party: All Jammu and Kashmir Muslim Conference
- Relations: Attique Ahmed Khan (son)

Sardar Muhammad Abdul Qayyum Khan (also known as ʻAbdul Qayyūm K̲h̲ān, Urdu: سردار محمد عبدالقيوم خان) was a Azad Kashmiri politician who also served as the president and prime minister of Azad Kashmir. He also remained President of All Jammu and Kashmir Muslim Conference for over 20 years. He belonged to the Dhund-Abbassi tribe.

== Early life and career ==
Sardar Abdul Qayyum was born on 4 April 1924 in Ghaziabad, Bagh tehsil (Poonch jagir), then part of the princely state of Jammu and Kashmir into an Abbasi family. After completing his secondary education in Jammu, he joined the Engineers Corps of the British Indian Army and served in Africa and the Middle East.

== 1947 Kashmir conflict ==
He actively participated in the Kashmiri freedom struggle. His title Mujahid-e-Awwal (the first holy warrior) who organized the freedom fighters of the area for armed struggle in 1947.

== Political career ==
In 1951, he joined the All Jammu and Kashmir Muslim Conference. He was elected president of this body a record 14 times during his lifetime. He was elected as President of Azad Jammu and Kashmir (AJK) state three times in 1956, 1971, and 1985. "Towards the end of his term, his relations with then prime minister Zulfiqar Ali Bhutto started turning sour. As a result, in 1974, Sardar Abdul Qayyum Khan was removed from the office of the president through a vote of no confidence."

He also remained Prime Minister of Azad Kashmir from 1991 to 1996. In 2002, he was made chairman of the National Kashmir Committee. His son Sardar Attique Ahmed Khan also became Prime Minister of Azad Kashmir in 2006 and then again in 2010.

== Writer ==
He is the author of dozens of books on the Kashmir Freedom Struggle (Kashmir conflict). He also wrote on political, mystic, spiritual and religious topics. Some of the publications include:

- Kashmir seeks attention
- Kashmir problem : options for settlement? : a geopolitical analysis
- Kashmīr banegā Pākistān
- Āzād Kashmīr men̲ Islāmī qavānīn kā nafāz̲, on the enforcement of Islamic laws in Azad Kashmir during 1971–1975; speeches and articles previously published separately in various journals.
- Muqaddamah-yi Kashmīr, a historical study on the Kashmir dispute.
- Muzakirat say Marshall Law Tak

== Death and legacy ==
He died in Rawalpindi on 10 July 2015. The Azad Kashmir government announced a three-day mourning period on his death.

== See also ==
- Presidents of Kashmir
- Chaudhry Ghulam Abbas
