= Prime Minister of Azad Kashmir =

Chief executive of Azad Jammu & Kashmir, Pakistan

Prime Minister of Azad Jammu & Kashmir
- وزِیرِ اعظم آزاد جموں و کشمیر
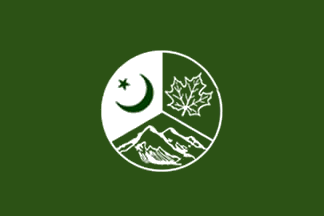
- Prime Ministerial Standard

- Flag of Azad Jammu & Kashmir
- Incumbent; Iftikhar Gilani since 28 August 2026
- Government of Azad Kashmir
- Style: The Honourable; Mr. Prime Minister (informal); His Excellency (diplomatic)
- Type: Head of government
- Status: Leader of the House
- Abbreviation: PM
- Member of: Azad Kashmir Legislative Assembly; Cabinet of Azad Kashmir
- Reports to: Azad Kashmir Legislative Assembly; President of Azad Kashmir
- Residence: Prime Minister House, Domail Muzaffarabad, 13100
- Seat: Prime Minister Secretariat, Muzaffarabad
- Nominator: Election Commission of Azad Kashmir through General Elections: by a Convention that is held in the Legislative Assembly, based on appointee's ability to command confidence among the majority of the members.
- Appointer: President of Azad Kashmir
- Term length: 5 years; renewable
- Constituting instrument: Interim Constitution of Azad Kashmir
- Precursor: Prime Minister of the Princely State of Jammu and Kashmir
- Inaugural holder: Abdul Hamid Khan (1975–1977)
- Formation: 5 July 1975; 48 years ago
- Deputy: No fixed position; however held by Speaker of Legislative Assembly in Prime Minister's absence
- Salary: Rs. 36.60 lakh (US$13,000), annual
- Website: pmajk.gov.pk

The prime minister of Azad Kashmir (Urdu: وزِیرِ اعظم آزاد کشمیر, romanized: Wazīr ē Aʿẓam lit. 'Grand Vizier', Urdu pronunciation: [ʋəˈziːr-ˌeː ˈɑː.zəm]) is the chief executive of Azad Jammu and Kashmir region of Pakistan. The title of Prime Minister symbolizes the nominal independence of Azad Kashmir. The prime minister heads the Council of Ministers, who are appointed from amongst the members of the Azad Kashmir Legislative Assembly. The premier too is elected by the AJK Legislative Assembly which is directly elected by the people.

The current prime minister is Iftikhar Gilani, a member of the Pakistan Muslim League (N) who took office on 28 August 2026 following the ousting of Faisal Mumtaz Rathore through a motion of no confidence.

== Prime ministers of the Princely State of Jammu and Kashmir (1917–1947) ==
#	Name	Took office	Left office
1	Raja Sir Daljit Singh	1917	1921
2	Raja Hari Singh	1925	1927
3	Sir Albion Banerjee	January 1927	March 1929
4	G. E. C. Wakefield	1929	1931
5	Hari Krishan Kaul	1931	1932
6	Elliot James Dowell Colvin	1932	1936
7	Sir Barjor J. Dalal	1936	1936
8	Sir N. Gopalaswami Ayyangar	1937	July 1943
9	Kailash Narain Haksar	July 1943	February 1944
10	Sir B. N. Rau	February 1944	28 June 1945
11	Ram Chandra Kak	28 June 1945	11 August 1947
12	Janak Singh	11 August 1947	15 October 1947
13	Mehr Chand Mahajan	15 October 1947	27 October 1947

== List of prime ministers ==
#	Portrait	Name	Took office	Left office	Party
1		Abdul Hamid Khan	5 July 1975	31 August 1977	Pakistan Peoples Party
2		Sardar Sikandar Hayat	17 June 1985	28 June 1990	All Jammu and Kashmir Muslim Conference
3		Raja Mumtaz Hussain	29 June 1990	5 July 1991	Pakistan Peoples Party
4		Sardar Abdul Qayyum	29 July 1991	29 July 1996	All Jammu and Kashmir Muslim Conference
5		Sultan Mehmood Chaudhry	30 July 1996	24 July 2001	Pakistan Peoples Party
6		Sardar Sikandar Hayat	25 July 2001	23 July 2006	All Jammu and Kashmir Muslim Conference
7		Sardar Attique Ahmed	24 July 2006	6 January 2009	All Jammu and Kashmir Muslim Conference
8		Sardar Yaqoob Khan	7 January 2009	22 October 2009	Independent
9		Raja Farooq Haider	23 October 2009	29 July 2010	All Jammu and Kashmir Muslim Conference
10		Sardar Attique Ahmed	29 July 2010	26 July 2011	All Jammu and Kashmir Muslim Conference
11		Chaudhry Abdul Majeed	26 July 2011	30 July 2016	Pakistan Peoples Party
12		Raja Farooq Haider	31 July 2016	30 July 2021	Pakistan Muslim League (N)
13		Sardar Abdul Qayyum Niazi	4 August 2021	14 April 2022	Pakistan Tehreek-e-Insaf
14		Tanveer Ilyas	18 April 2022	11 April 2023	Pakistan Tehreek-e-Insaf
15		Chaudhry Anwarul Haq	20 April 2023	17 November 2025	Pakistan Tehreek-e-Insaf forward bloc
16		Faisal Mumtaz Rathore	17 November 2025	28 August 2026	Pakistan Peoples Party
17		Iftikhar Gilani	28 August 2026	Incumbent	Pakistan Muslim League (N)

== See also ==
- Government of Azad Kashmir
- President of Azad Kashmir
