= Sikandar Hayat Khan (Azad Kashmir politician) =

Pakistani politician (1934–2021)

- سردار سِکندر حیات خان

Prime Minister of Azad Kashmir
- In office 17 June 1985 – 28 June 1990
- Preceded by: Abdul Hamid Khan
- Succeeded by: Raja Mumtaz Hussain
- In office 25 July 2001 – 23 July 2006
- Preceded by: Sultan Mehmood Chaudhry
- Succeeded by: Sardar Attique Ahmed

President of Azad Kashmir
- In office 12 August 1991 – 11 May 1996
- Preceded by: Abdul Rashid Abbasi (Acting)
- Succeeded by: Abdul Rashid Abbasi (Acting)
- In office 23 May 1996 – 11 August 1996
- Preceded by: Abdul Rashid Abbasi (Acting)
- Succeeded by: Raja Mumtaz Hussain (Acting)

Personal details
- Born: 1 June 1934 Poonch, Jammu and Kashmir, British India
- Died: 9 October 2021 (aged 87) Poonch, Azad Jammu and Kashmir, Pakistan
- Party: All Jammu and Kashmir Muslim Conference
- Other political affiliations: Pakistan Muslim League (N)

Sardar Sikandar Hayat Khan (Urdu: سردار سِکندر حیات خان) (1 June 1934 – 9 October 2021) was an Azad Kashmiri politician who served as the Prime Minister of Azad Kashmir for two non-consecutive terms. He also served as the President of Azad Kashmir twice. He was the longest-serving prime minister of Azad Kashmir, having served a total of more than 10 years across two tenures.

== Early life and education ==
Born into an eminent political family of Domaal Rajputs from Kashmir, Khan was the son of Sardar Fateh Muhammad Khan Karailvi, famous for his role in one of the first major uprisings against the Dogra regime in 1931. His father led the protest against a tax on salt imposed by the Maharaja's regime. Sardar Fateh Muhammad Khan Karailvi along with Baba-e-Poonch Col Khan Muhammad Khan were the only two elected members of the Jammu Kashmir Legislative Assembly Called "Praja Sabha" from Poonch District for 12 consecutive years from 1934-46.

Sardar Sikandar Hayat Khan received his early schooling in his native village of Karela in Fatehpur Thakiala, now in District Kotli, and in Poonch city. He went on to study at Gordon College (Rawalpindi), graduating in 1956 before going on to the University Law College in Lahore to obtain a law degree in 1958.

== Career ==
After formally joining the All Jammu and Kashmir Muslim Conference, he ran for membership in the Kotli council, a position he occupied for eight years, during which he was also elected the President of Bar Association, Kotli. In 1970, he was elected to the Azad Jammu & Kashmir Legislative Assembly and became the Revenue Minister in 1972.

He returned to office from his constituency in every election held in Azad Kashmir between 1970 and 2001, barring the years when he was President of Azad Kashmir. His brother Sardar Muhammad Naeem Khan served as a member from that area during that period.

He served as acting President of the Jammu & Kashmir Muslim Conference in the 1976–78 period and was elected President in 1978, a position he held until 1988. In 1985, he was elected Prime Minister of AJK and served until 1990. He headed the opposition in the Assembly until 1991, when he was elected President of AJK for a five-year term. On 25 July 2001, he was sworn in as Prime Minister of AJK for a second time, serving another five-year term. Khan initially retired from active politics in July 2006. However, he later played a major role in introducing Pakistan Muslim League (N) in AJK for which he was given the position of Senior Vice President of PML-(N) in 2011.

He quit PML-(N) in February 2021 and joined the Muslim Conference as head of the party.

== Death ==
On 9 October 2021, Hayat, who was diabetic and a cardiac patient, died in his hometown; aged 87.

Political offices
Preceded by Abdul Hamid Khan	Prime Minister of Azad Jammu and Kashmir; 1985–1990	Succeeded by Raja Mummtaz Hussain Rathore
Preceded by Sardar Mohammad Abdul Qayyum Khan	President of Azad Jammu and Kashmir; 1991–1996	Succeeded by Sardar Muhammad Ibrahim Khan
Preceded by Barrister Sultan Mahmood	Prime Minister of Azad Jammu and Kashmir; 2001–2006	Succeeded by Sardar Attique Ahmed Khan
