= All Jammu and Kashmir Muslim Conference =

Political party in Azad Kashmir, Pakistan

All Jammu and Kashmir Muslim Conference آل جموں و کشمیر مسلم کانفرنس
- Abbreviation: AJKMC, MC
- President: Sardar Attique Ahmed Khan
- Secretary-General: Mehrun-Nissa
- Senior Vice President: Sardar Altaf Hussain Khan
- Founder: Chaudhry Ghulam Abbas, Mirwaiz Yusuf Shah, Agha Shaukat Ali and Syed Aziz Badshah
- Founded: 1941 (85 years ago)
- Split from: Jammu & Kashmir National Conference
- Headquarters: Muzaffarabad
- Ideology: Islamic democracy Kashmiriyat; Pakistani nationalism Kashmir unification with Pakistan
- Colors: Orange
- AJK Assembly: 0 / 53

Election symbol
- Horse

Party flag
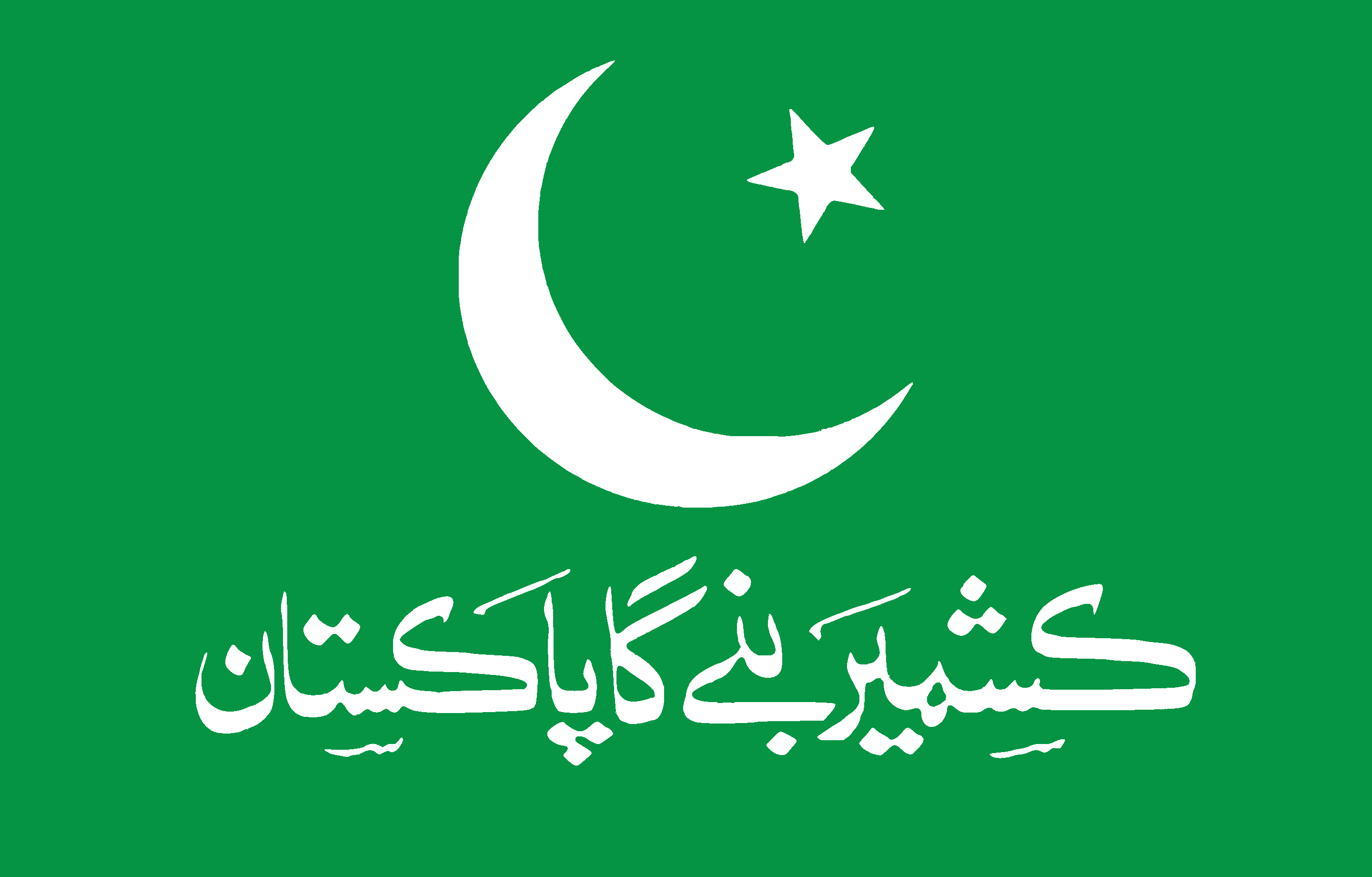

Website
- Official website

The All Jammu and Kashmir Muslim Conference (Urdu: آل جموں و کشمیر مسلم کانفرنس) also shortly referred as Muslim Conference (MC) is a political party in Pakistan administered territory of Azad Jammu and Kashmir.

The party was founded in 1941 by Chaudhry Ghulam Abbas, Mirwaiz Yusuf Shah, Agha Shaukat Ali and Syed Aziz Badshah of Dadyal in the former princely state of Jammu and Kashmir as a splinter group of the Jammu & Kashmir National Conference, which took the name the National Conference went by from its founding in October 1932 until June 1939.

After the Partition of India, the party supported the accession of the princely state to Pakistan, and instigated the Poonch Rebellion against the Maharaja's government under the leadership of its legislator Sardar Muhammad Ibrahim Khan. Pakistan, after turning the rebellion into an outright invasion, installed Ibrahim Khan as the President of the rebel-controlled region, called Azad Jammu and Kashmir.

== See also ==
- Political movements during the Dogra rule
- 1947 Poonch Rebellion
- Sardar Muhammad Ibrahim Khan
