= List of Azad Kashmir Legislative Assembly constituencies =

This is a list of the constituencies in the Azad Kashmir Legislative Assembly.

== List of Constituencies ==
Division	District	Constituency	Boundaries
Mirpur	Mirpur	LA-1 Mirpur-I	Dadyal Tehsil
Mirpur	Mirpur	LA-2 Mirpur-II	The following Patwar Circles of Mirpur Tehsil: Palak; Pind Khurd; Dheri Phali; Dheri Barwan; Chakswari; Panyam; Boa; Tang Dew; Kaneli; Mawah; Bajjar; Herdochi; Islamgarh; Kalyal Bhainsi; Potha Bainsi
Mirpur	Mirpur	LA-3 Mirpur-III	The following Patwar Circles of Mirpur Tehsil: Khanpur; Kharak; Rathoa Muhammad Ali; Thothal; Sangot; Mirpur Municipal Area; Sector A, Sector B, Sector C, Sector D, Sector E and Sector F of New City Mirpur
Mirpur	Mirpur	LA-4 Mirpur-IV	The following Patwar Circles of Mirpur Tehsil: Khari Khas; Azizpur; Lehri; Sonkia; Bhalyala except Sector A, Sector B, Sector C, Sector D, Sector E and Sector F of New City Mirpur; Khurd; Pindi Suburwal; Afzalpur; Samwal Sharif; Pul Manda; Sahang; Banni; Balwara; Jatlan; Jouian; Jangian; Pakhral; Naugran; Dhal Mahmood; Raipur
Mirpur	Bhimber	LA-5 Bhimber-I	Barnala Tehsil
Mirpur	Bhimber	LA-6 Bhimber-II	Samahni Tehsil
Mirpur	Bhimber	LA-7 Bhimber-III	Bhimber Tehsil
Mirpur	Kotli	LA-8 Kotli-I	The following Patwar Circles of Kotli Tehsil: Dhanwan; Goi; Kakni Baggah; Phagwari; Jhanjora; Dundli; Qamrooti; Chowki Teenda
Mirpur	Kotli	LA-9 Kotli-II	Fatehpur Tehsil The following Patwar Circle of Kotli Tehsil: Khad Gujran
Mirpur	Kotli	LA-10 Kotli-III	The following Patwar Circles of Kotli Tehsil: Kotli Khas; Roli; Dhamol; Gulhar Sharif; Bhnair; Barali; Sarhota
Mirpur	Kotli	LA-11 Kotli-IV	Sehnsa Tehsil The following Patwar Circles of Kotli Tehsil: Siah; Panjera; Sersawa; Odah; Anoi Sarhuta
Mirpur	Kotli	LA-12 Kotli-V	Charhoi Tehsil Dolian-Jattan Tehsil The following Patwar Circle of Kotli Tehsil: Danna The following Patwar Circle of Khuiratta Tehsil: Tain
Mirpur	Kotli	LA-13 Kotli-VI	Khuiratta Tehsil, except for Patwar Circle Tain
Poonch	Bagh	LA-14 Bagh-I	Dhirkot Tehsil, except village Malot of Patwar Circle Choor
Poonch	Bagh	LA-15 Bagh-II	The following Patwar Circles of Harigehl Tehsil: Jaglar; Thub; Rawali; Topi; Banni Passari; Village Malot of Patwar Circle Choor of Dhirkot Tehsil; Nariyola; Kafalgarh; The following Patwar Circles of Bagh Tehsil: Beerpani; Banni Manhasan
Poonch	Bagh	LA-16 Bagh-III	Bagh Tehsil, except for Patwar Circles of Beerpani and Banni Manhasan
Poonch	Bagh	LA-17 Bagh-IV	Haveli Tehsil Khurshidabad Tehsil Mumtazabad Tehsil
Poonch	Poonch & Sudhnoti	LA-18 Poonch & Sudhnoti-I	Abbaspur Tehsil The following Patwar Circles of Hajira Tehsil: Ghameer; Sehr Kakuta; Battal; Mandhol; Serh; Tahi
Poonch	Poonch & Sudhnoti	LA-19 Poonch & Sudhnoti-II	The following Patwar Circles of Hajira Tehsil: Hajira/Kathiara; Sarrari; Bhanteni; Kari Kot; Phagwati; Rakkar; Akhor Ban; Pothi Chaprian, excluding village Pirh Kot; The following Patwar Circles of Trarkhal Tehsil of Sudhanoti District: Narrian, excluding Village Nerian, Habibabad; Trarkhal, excluding Village Manshaabad, Bariot; Pappay Narr
Poonch	Poonch & Sudhnoti	LA-20 Poonch & Sudhnoti-III	The following Patwar Circles of Rawalakot Tehsil: Pakharr; Ali Sojal; Dothan; Chhota Galla, excluding village Darek; Jandali; Hussainkot; Kooyan; Village Pirhkot of Patwar Circle Pothi Chaprian of Hajira Tehsil
Poonch	Poonch & Sudhnoti	LA-21 Poonch & Sudhnoti-IV	The following Patwar Circles of Rawalakot Tehsil: Pothi Makwalan; Rawalakot; Dhamni; Sangola; Mutial Mera; Muncipal Corporation Rawalakot; Village Darek of Patwar Circle Choota Gala; Village Copra of Patwar Circle Koiyan
Poonch	Poonch & Sudhnoti	LA-22 Poonch & Sudhnoti-V	The following Patwar Circles of Rawalakot Tehsil: Pachiot; Hurnamera; Bangoin; Timruta; Banakh; Reharra; Thorar Tehsil
Poonch	Poonch & Sudhnoti	LA-23 Poonch & Sudhnoti-VI	The following Patwar Circles of Sudhnoti Tehsil: Gorah Shumali; Pallandri; Daar Dharachh (Afzalabad); Gorah Junoobi; Baral; Islampura; Jhanda Bagla; Azad Pattan; Panthal; Mang Tehsil
Poonch	Poonch & Sudhnoti	LA-24 Poonch & Sudhnoti-VII	The following Patwar Circle Sehr of Sudhnoti Tehsil Baloch Tehsil Village Nerian, Habibabad of Patwar Circle Nerian and Village Manshaabad, Bariot of Patwar Circle Trarkhal, of Trarkhal Tehsil
Muzaffarabad	Neelum	LA-25 Neelum-I	The following Patwar Circles of Athmuqam Tehsil: Nagdar, excluding village Neelum; Dawarian; Lawat; Doodhnia; Sharda Tehsil
Muzaffarabad	Neelum	LA-26 Neelum-II	The following Patwar Circles of Athmuqam Tehsil: Athmuqam; Shahkot; Jagran; Bandi Ashkot; Lesawa; Chalhana Jageer; Mirpura; Village Neelum of Patwar Circle Nagdar
Muzaffarabad	Muzaffarabad	LA-27 Muzaffarabad-I	The following Patwar Circles of Patikka Tehsil: Talgran; Riali; Saidpur; Bandi Khatana; Kahori; Naseerabad; Seri Bheri; Doba; Batt Darra; Machhiara; Palla Mangran; BalgranThe following Patwar Circles of Muzaffarabad Tehsil: Muslimabad; Heer Kutli; Chehla Bandi, excluding Village Bandi Mir Samdani and Chehla
Muzaffarabad	Muzaffarabad	LA-28 Muzaffarabad-II	The following Patwar Circles of Patikka Tehsil: Panjgran; Dewlian; Panjkot; Nauseri; Patika; NooraseriThe following Patwar Circles of Muzaffarabad Tehsil: Chhattar Domel, excluding Villages Charwaya, Ambore, Chhattar Domel, Dhanni Syedan; Seri Darra, excluding Village Ranjata; Hotrari; Domel, excluding Villages Mera Tanolian, Bandi Tanolian and Domel; Patwar Circle Dhanni, excluding Village Dhanni; Gan Chhattar; Garhi Dopatta
Muzaffarabad	Muzaffarabad	LA-29 Muzaffarabad-III	The following Patwar Circles of Muzaffarabad Tehsil: Muzaffarabad; Gojra; Kutli; Patreend; Villages Ambore, Chhattar Domel, Dhanni Syedan of Patwar Circle Chhattar Domel; Villages Mera Tanolian, Bandi Tanolian and Domel of Patwar Circle Domel; Village Ranjata of Patwar Circle Seri Darra; Villages Bandi Mir Samdani and Chehla of Patwar Circle Chehla Bandi; Village Dhanni of Patwar Circle Dhanni
Muzaffarabad	Muzaffarabad	LA-30 Muzaffarabad-IV	Patwar Circle Langla of Hattian Tehsil The following Patwar Circles of Muzaffarabad Tehsil: Kai Manja; Hattian Dopatta; Langarpura; Thotha; Lawasi; Dachhor Meeran
Muzaffarabad	Muzaffarabad	LA-31 Muzaffarabad-V	The following Patwar Circles of Muzaffabad Tehsil: Mustafaabad; Anwaar Sharif; Therian; Chanalbang; Charakpura; Noorpur Nakran; Koomikot; Chhattar Kalas; Danna; Dalli; Kacheeli; Ballan; Ramkot; Katker; Mera Kalan; Mera Khurd; Jhandgran; Narat; Charwaya of Patwar Circle Chatter Domel
Muzaffarabad	Muzaffarabad	LA-32 Muzaffarabad-VI	Chikkar Tehsil The following Patwar Circles of Hattian Tehsil: Khallana Khurd; Khallana Kalan; Sarak Chanari; Chakothi; Hattian; Malakpura; Banni Hafiz; Daaman
Muzaffarabad	Muzaffarabad	LA-33 Muzaffarabad-VII	Leepa Tehsil The following Patwar Circles of Hattian Tehsil: Gujjar Bandi; Mera Bakot; Chakhama; Nardajjian; Lamnian; Maknatt; Khaanda
Refugee Constituencies	Jammu & Others	LA-34 Jammu and Others-I	Balochistan Sindh The following Divisions of Punjab: Bahawalpur; Multan; Dera Ghazi Khan; Faisalabad; Sahiwal; Sargodha; Lahore
Refugee Constituencies	Jammu & Others	LA-35 Jammu and Others-II	The following Districts of Punjab: Gujranwala; Hafizabad; Sialkot, except for Sialkot Tehsil
Refugee Constituencies	Jammu & Others	LA-36 Jammu and Others-III	Sialkot Tehsil
Refugee Constituencies	Jammu & Others	LA-37 Jammu and Others-IV	Narowal District
Refugee Constituencies	Jammu & Others	LA-38 Jammu and Others-V	The following Districts of Punjab: Wazirabad; Gujrat; Mandi Bahauddin
Refugee Constituencies	Jammu & Others	LA-39 Jammu and Others-VI	Khyber Pakhtunkhwa Islamabad Capital Territory Rawalpindi Division
Refugee Constituencies	Kashmir Valley	LA-40 Kashmir Valley-I	Balochistan Sindh
Refugee Constituencies	Kashmir Valley	LA-41 Kashmir Valley-II	Lahore Division
Refugee Constituencies	Kashmir Valley	LA-42 Kashmir Valley-III	The following Divisions of Punjab: Bahawalpur; Multan; Dera Ghazi Khan; Gujranwala; Gujrat; Faisalabad; Sargodha; Sahiwal; The following Districts of Rawalpindi: Jhelum, Chakwal, and Talagang
Refugee Constituencies	Kashmir Valley	LA-43 Kashmir Valley-IV	Wards No. 15 to 50 in Rawalpindi (as these wards existed in 1985)
Refugee Constituencies	Kashmir Valley	LA-44 Kashmir Valley-V	Wards No. 1 to 14 in Rawalpindi (as these wards existed in 1985) Wards No. 1 to 10 in Rawalpindi Cantonment Rawalpindi District, except for Rawalpindi Murree District Attock District Islamabad Capital Territory
Refugee Constituencies	Kashmir Valley	LA-45 Kashmir Valley-VI	Khyber Pakhtunkhwa

== See also ==
- List of constituencies of Pakistan
