= List of members of the 10th Legislative Assembly of Azad Kashmir =

10th assembly of Azad Kashmir

10th Assembly of Azad Kashmir
- 10th term of the Azad Kashmir Legislative Assembly

Type
- Type: Unicameral

Leadership
- Speaker: Chaudhry Latif Akbar, PPP since 3 June 2023
- Deputy Speaker: Riaz Gujar, PTI since 4 August 2021
- Leader of the House: Chaudhry Anwar-ul-Haq, PTI since 20 April 2023
- Leader of the Opposition: Khawaja Farooq Ahmad, PTI since 11 July 2023

Structure
- Seats: 53
- Political groups: Government(43): PTI (21); PPP (13); PML (N) (8); AJKMC (1); Opposition (10): PTI (9); JKPP (1)

Elections
- Last election: 25 July 2021
- Next election: July 2026

Meeting place
- Muzaffarabad, Azad Jammu and Kashmir, Pakistan

The 10th Assembly of Azad Kashmir is the current legislative body of the autonomous region of Azad Jammu and Kashmir in Pakistan, formed as a result of the 2021 Azad Kashmiri general election. The elections were held on 25 July 2021 after the 5-year term of the previous Legislative Assembly expired. The Pakistan Tehreek-e-Insaf (PTI) was successful, winning with a simple majority and subsequently forming a government in the region.

== Members ==
Constituency	Name	Political Party
LA-1 Mirpur-I	Azhar Sadiq	PTI
LA-2 Mirpur-II	Chaudhry Qasim Majeed	PPP
LA-3 Mirpur-III	Choudhry Yasir Sultan	PTI
LA-4 Mirpur-IV	Ch. Arshad Hussain	PTI
LA-5 Bhimber-I	Waqar Ahmed Noor	PML-N
LA-6 Bhimber-II	Ali Shan Chaudhry	PTI
LA-7 Bhimber-III	Chaudhry Anwarul Haq	PTI
LA-8 Kotli-I	Zaffar Iqbal Malik	PTI
LA-9 Kotli-II	Ch. Javaid Iqbal Badhanvi	PPP
LA-10 Kotli-III	Choudhary Muhammad Yasin	PPP
LA-11 Kotli-IV	Ch. Muhammad Ikhlaq	PTI
LA-12 Kotli-V	Amir Yasin	PPP
LA-13 Kotli-VI	Nisar Ansar	PTI
LA-14 Bagh-I	Sardar Attique Ahmed Khan	AJKMC
LA-15 Bagh-II	Sardar Ziaul Qamar	PPP
LA-16 Bagh-III	Sardar Mir Akbar Khan	PTI
LA-17 Bagh-IV	Raja Faisal Mumtaz Rathore	PPP
LA-18 Poonch & Sudhnoti-I	Abdul Qayyum Khan Niazi	PTI
LA-19 Poonch & Sudhnoti-II	Sardar Amir Altaf	PML-N
LA-20 Poonch & Sudhnoti-III	Sardar Muhammad Yaqoob Khan	PPP
LA-21 Poonch & Sudhnoti-IV	Sardar Hassan Ibrahem	JKPP
LA-22 Poonch & Sudhnoti-V	Shahida Saghir	PTI
LA-23 Poonch & Sudhnoti-VI	Sardar Muhammad Hussain	PTI
LA-24 Poonch & Sudhnoti-VII	Faheem Akhter	PTI
LA-25 Neelum-I	Shah Ghulam Qadir	PML-N
LA-26 Neelum-II	Abdul Waheed	PPP
LA-27 Muzaffarabad-I	Sardar Muhammad Javed	PPP
LA-28 Muzaffarabad-II	Syed Bazal Ali Naqvi	PPP
LA-29 Muzaffarabad-III	Kh. Farooq Ahmed	PTI
LA-30 Muzaffarabad-IV	Muhammad Rasheed	PTI
LA-31 Muzaffarabad-V	Ch. Latif Akbar	PPP
LA-32 Muzaffarabad-VI	Farooq Haider Khan	PML-N
LA-33 Muzaffarabad-VII	Dewan Ali Khan	PTI
LA-34 Jammu and Others-I	Riaz Ahmed	PTI
LA-35 Jammu and Others-II		
LA-36 Jammu and Others-III	Hafiz Hamid Raza	PTI
LA-37 Jammu and Others-IV	Muhammad Akmal Sargala	PTI
LA-38 Jammu and Others-V	Muhammad Akbar Chaudhry	PTI
LA-39 Jammu and Others-VI	Raja Muhammad Siddique	PML-N
LA-40 Kashmir Valley-I	Amir Abdul Ghaffar Lone	PPP
LA-41 Kashmir Valley-II	Ghulam Mohhi ud Din Dewan	PTI
LA-42 Kashmir Valley-III	Muhammad Asim Shrif	PTI
LA-43 Kashmir Valley-IV	Javed Butt	PTI
LA-44 Kashmir Valley-V	Muhammad Ahmed Raza Qadri	PML-N
LA-45 Kashmir Valley-VI	Abdul Majid Khan	PTI
Reserved seat for women	Imtiz Nasim	PTI
Reserved seat for women	Sabiha Saddique Ch.	PTI
Reserved seat for women	Kausar Taqdees Gillani	PTI
Reserved seat for women	Nabela Ayoub Khan	PPP
Reserved seat for women	Nisaran Abbasi	
Reserved seat for Ulema-e-Din or Mushaikh	Muhammad Mazhir Saeed	
Reserved seat for overseas	Muhammad Iqbal	
Reserved seat for Technocrats	Muhammad Rafique Nayyar	
