= Sakhi Daler Khan =

Pakistani Army officer (1924–1994)

Fateh-e-Kotli Ghazi-e-Azadi Raja Sakhi Daler Khan
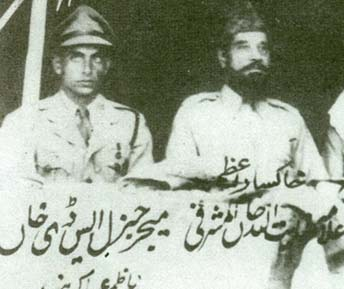
- Sakhi Delair Khan with Mashriqi
- Born: 13 December 1924; Sarsawa (now Sakhi Delar Abad), Kotli District, Azad Jammu and Kashmir
- Died: 16 September 1994 (aged 69)
- Military career
- Allegiance: British Raj; Free India; Pakistan
- Branch: British Indian Army; Indian National Army; Pakistan Army
- Conflicts: World War II; First Kashmir War

Raja Sakhi Daler Khan (or Sakhi Delair Khan; 13 December 1924 – 16 September 1994) was an Indian Army officer. He led Pakistani troops and irregulars in the Indo-Pakistani War of 1947. Due to his major role in the liberation of the kotli of Azad Jammu and Kashmir, the village of Sarsawa was subsequently renamed Sakhi Delair Abad in his honour.

== Biography ==
Raja Sakhi Delair Khan was born in the village of Sarsawa, Kotli on 13 December 1924, to a Mangral Rajput family. He joined the Indian National Army. He resigned from his post and joined the All-India Muslim League on 6 June 1946. League leader Mohammad Ali Jinnah requested that he file a report about the current situation of the state of Jammu and Kashmir. Khan visited the Chief Minister of Jammu and Kashmir, Ram Chandra Kak and the last ruling Maharrajah, Maharaja Hari Singh, to better understand their views on whether Jammu and Kashmir should join with Pakistan as laid out in the British proposal for post-Independence India and Pakistan. He reported back to Jinnah at his residence at Aurang Zaib Road, Delhi in 1946 that an alternative plan was required to liberate Jammu and Kashmir.

Khan tried to organise army veterans and recruit them for the fighting for Jammu and Kashmir by showing them a circular signed by Jinnah establishing a War Council on 5 September 1947. Following this, Khan led many battles against the Dogra forces that were currently in control of the area, particularly in Kotli District and Rajouri District.

Under the leadership of Raja Sakhi Daler Khan the Muslims of Rajouri rose against the Dogra rulers and took Rajouri.

Rajouri was subsequently subject to a heavy armed assault lasting several days by the Fiftieth Parachute Brigade, the Eightieth Brigade, and the 19th Indian Infantry Brigade supported by tanks of the Central Indian Horse. Rajouri fell under control of Indian forces on 12 April 1948, becoming part of the Indian state Jammu and Kashmir.

Khan died on 16 September 1994, at the age of 69.

== Decorations ==
The War Council awarded Khan the following honours:

- Fakhr-e-Kashmir (Honour of Kashmir)
- Ghazi-e-Kashmir (Warrior of Kashmir)
- Khadam-e-Din (Servant of the Deen)
- Commander in Chief, Tehreek-e-Azaadi
- Chief Convenor, Jammu and Kashmir Historical Committee

== Bibliography ==
- Tarekh-e-Kotli Mangralan, Raja Sarfraz Ahmad Khan Mangral
- Mirpur Before 1947, Sayad Sultan Shah
- The Kashmir, Khalid Mehmood Kokhar Adocate Kotli
- Maghribi Jammu Main Jang-e-Azadi, M. Latif
