= Barali, Pakistan =

Coordinates: 33°28′N 73°52′E

Barali, Azad Kashmir
- Village and union council
- Interactive map of Barali, Azad Kashmir
- Sovereign state: Pakistan
- Dependent territory: Azad Kashmir
- District: Kotli District
- Time zone: UTC+5 (PST)

Barali is a union council located between Kotli and Gulpur in Kotli District, Azad Kashmir.

== History ==
Barali is a village and union council located between Kotli and Gulpur.

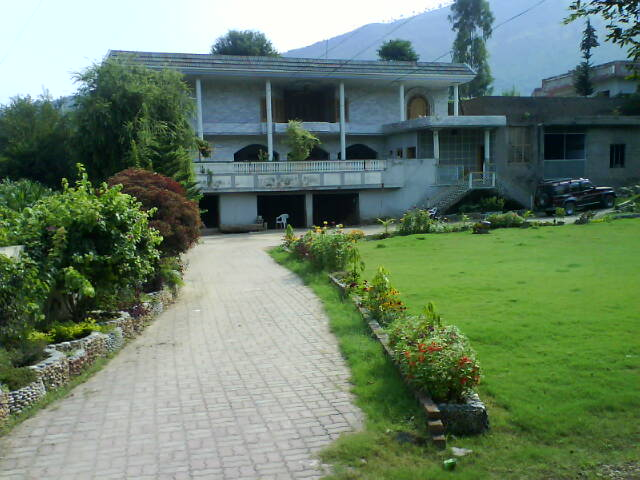
House located in Barali

Adjacent villages of Barali are Brali, Kawali, Fagosh, Fafeel, dheri, saplah, Nala, Sagyam, Danna, Dungi, Maneel
