= Holar, Azad Kashmir =

Holar
- Location within Azad Kashmir
- Coordinates: 33.592772°N 73.613781°E
- Country: Pakistan
- Province: Azad Kashmir
- District: Kotli
- Tehsil: Sehnsa
- Time zone: UTC+5 (PST)

Holar (or Hollar) is a city in the Sehnsa tehsil of Kotli District, of Azad Kashmir, Pakistan. It has a crossing on the Jhelum river, which used to be called Owen Pattan in the princely state of Jammu and Kashmir, but now called Holar bridge. The Kahuta–Kotli road passes over the bridge.

== Bibliography ==
- Singh, K. Brahma (1990), History of Jammu and Kashmir Rifles, 1820-1956: The State Force Background, Lancer International, ISBN 978-81-7062-091-4
  - Singh, K. Brahma (2010) [first published Lancer International 1990], History of Jammu and Kashmir Rifles, 1820-1956: The State Force Background (PDF), brahmasingh.co.nf, ISBN 978-81-7062-091-4, archived from the original (PDF) on 2016-03-06
