= Dandli =

Town in Kotli District, Azad Kashmir

Coordinates: 33°32′N 73°58′E

Dandli is a town in Kotli District, Azad Kashmir. It is located 13 kilometres from Kotli. There are many mineral resources in the town Koila, Gandhaik. A big hill Arri Gala is located near Dandli. Dandli is also a Union Council and it contains villages of Gowan, Panag, Johr Jabr, Gojra Town, Nailan, Gunni. Dandli have a stream flowing towards Poonch River.
