= Provincial assemblies of Pakistan =

Provincial Assembly (Urdu: صوبائی اسمبلی) is a legislative body in the provinces and regions of Pakistan. Each of the four provinces and 2 autonomous regions of the country has a unicameral legislature. Only Islamabad is governed directly by the Federal Government of Pakistan and has no legislative body.

== Member of Provincial Assembly ==
Member of Provincial Assembly is called MPA in Pakistan. Members of Provincial Assembly are elected by elections every 5 years.

=== Qualification of members ===
According to Article 113 of the Constitution, the qualifications for membership in the National Assembly set forth in Article 62 of the Constitution also apply for membership to the Provincial Assembly. Thus, a member of the Provincial Assembly:

1. "must be a citizen of Pakistan;
2. "must be at least twenty-five years of age and must be enrolled as a voter in any electoral roll in–
  1. "any part of Pakistan, for election to a general seat or a seat reserved for non-Muslims; and
  2. "any area in a Province from which the member seeks membership for election to a seat reserved for women.
3. "must be of good character and not commonly known as one who violates Islamic injunctions;
4. "must have adequate knowledge of Islamic teachings and practices obligatory duties prescribed by Islam as well as abstains from major sins;
5. "must be sagacious, righteous, non-profligate, and honest;
6. "must have never been convicted for a crime involving moral turpitude or for giving false evidence;
7. "must have never, after the establishment of Pakistan, worked against the integrity of the country or opposed the ideology of Pakistan.

"The disqualifications specified in paragraphs 3 and 4 do not apply to a person who is a non-Muslim, but such a person must have good moral reputation and possess other qualifications prescribed by an act of Parliament."

== Current Provincial & Legislative Assemblies ==
Assembly	Seat	House strength	Ruling party	Structure
Azad Jammu and Kashmir Legislative Assembly	Muzaffarabad	53	PMLN	
Balochistan Assembly	Quetta	65	PPP	
Gilgit Baltistan Assembly	Gilgit	33	PPP	
Khyber Pakhtunkhwa Assembly	Peshawar	145	Independents	
Punjab Assembly	Lahore	371	PMLN	
Sindh Assembly	Karachi	168	PPP	
Total	—	835	—	—

== Former Provincial Assemblies ==
Assembly	Seat	House Strength	Period Active	Abolished by
East Bengal Provincial Assembly	Dhaka	300	1947–1971	1971 War
West Pakistan Provincial Assembly	Lahore	N/A	1954–1970	Dissolution of One Unit
