= Gulpur =

- town
- Location within Azad Kashmir Location within Pakistan
- Coordinates: 33°26′5″N 73°51′40″E
- Administering country: Pakistan
- Territory: Azad Kashmir
- District: Kotli District

Languages
  - Official: Urdu
  - Spoken: Pahari-Pothwari; Gojri
- Time zone: UTC+5 (PST)

Gulpur is a town in the Kotli District of Azad Kashmir, Pakistan. It is located at 33°26'5N 73°51'40E. It is located southwest of Kotli city and is located on the junction of the Kotli-Mirpur and Kotli-Rawalpindi road. Gulpur is a small town providing for the local villages as well as the residents of a large refugee camp.

Near Gulpur is a historical fort called Throchi Fort that is located in the Throchi village. It is 2 kilometres away from the Gulpur town.

The Maskar Raheel Shahid complex was targeted in an airstrike conducted by the Indian Air Force as part of Operation Sindoor on the night between on 7 May 2025.
