= University of Kotli =

University in Pakistan

University of Kotli (UOK) کوٹلی یونیورسٹی
- Motto: Enter to learn, leave to serve!
- Type: Public
- Established: 2014
- Affiliations: Higher Education Commission
- Chancellor: Sultan Mehmood Chaudhry (President of Azad Jammu & Kashmir (Pakistan))
- Vice-Chancellor: Prof. Dr. Rehmat Ali Khan
- Location: Kotli, Azad Jammu & Kashmir, Pakistan
- Mascot: kotlians
- Website: www.uokajk.edu.pk

The University of Kotli Azad Jammu and Kashmir is a university in the Pakistani-administered self-governing region of Azad Jammu and Kashmir. The university of Kotli (Urdu: کوٹلی یونیورسٹی) (UoK) was formerly a constituent college of the University of Azad Jammu and Kashmir. It was formerly known as the University College of Administrative Sciences Kotli (UCK) and as the Faculty of Administrative Sciences Kotli (FASK). UoK is a state university, and the president of Azad Jammu & Kashmir State serves as the chancellor of the university. The vice-chancellor is the chief executive and manages the university.

For the past three decades, the university's School of Administrative Sciences Kotli has had over 3,000 graduates in the fields of business management, public administration, commerce, computer science and information.

== History ==
UoK became a university as a result of Presidential Ordinance VIII of 2014. Initiative taken by Pakistan people's party in 2014. The change in the status of the school was made in order to offer higher education and research in the Country of Azad Jammu and Kashmir and their surrounding area.

== Organization ==
UoK is a state university, and the president of Azad Jammu & Kashmir State serves as the chancellor of the university. The vice-chancellor is the chief executive and manages the university.

== Degree programs ==
The university offers a broad range of bachelor's, master's and doctoral degree programs in 150+ disciplines such as architecture commerce, accounting, business administration, banking and finance, business and it, computer science, economics, education, electrical engineering, aviation, management, supply chain, textile engineering, industrial engineering, information systems, linguistics, media and communication, agri-business, school management, social sciences, educational leadership management, law, English language teaching, and many more and these are the details:

=== Bachelor's programs ===
- Business Administration
- Bachelor of Architecture and Town Planning
- Banking and Finance
- Commerce
- Management
- Mathematics
- Economics
- English
- Computer Sciences
- Information technology
- Software Engineering
- B.Tech(Software Engineering Technology)
- Biotechnology
- Botany
- Chemistry
- Physics
- Zoology
- Clinical Lab

=== Master degree programs ===
- MBA (3.5 years) after 2-year traditional bachelors
- MBA Executive (2-year)
- MBA (1.5 years) after 4-year bachelors or Masters
- BBS (2 year)
- M.Com. (2 years)
- MPA (2 years)
- M.Sc. HRM
- M.Sc. Banking and Finance
- M.Sc. Enterprise Management and Development studies
- M.Sc. Mathematics
- M.Sc. Economics
- M.Sc. Sociology
- M.Sc. Statistics
- M.Sc. Zoology
- M.A English
- M.Ed.
- LLB (3 years)

=== Ph.D./M.Phil./MS programs ===
- Ph.D. Economics
- Ph.D. Management Sciences
- Ph.D. Mathematics
- M.Phil./MS Mathematics
- M.Phil./MS Economics
- M.Phil./MS Management Sciences
- M.Phil./MS Computer Sciences

== Departments ==
The university has the following departments.

=== Faculty of Administrative Sciences ===
- Department of Business Administration
- Department of Software Engineering
- Department of Computer Science and Information technology
- Department of Public Administration
- Department of English
- Department of Law
- Department of Mathematics

=== Faculty of commerce ===
- Department of Commerce
- Department of Economics

=== Faculty of basic and applied Sciences ===
- Department of Biotechnology
- Department of Chemistry
- Department of Zoology
- Department of Allied Health Sciences
- Department of Botany
- Department of Physics

== Facilities ==
=== Library and laboratories ===
The university has a well-equipped library and computer laboratories.

== Scholarships ==
The university provides merit-based and need-based scholarships. Most of these are funded by private foundations and non-governmental organizations.

== See also ==
- List of institutions of higher education in Azad Kashmir
