= Holar =

Holar can refer to:

- Hólar, a small community in Iceland
- Holar, Kashmir, a town in Azad Kashmir
- Holar (people), India
