= Maneel =

Settlement in Pakistan

Maneel is a small village 10 km from the main bazaar of Kotli, Azad Kashmir, Pakistan.
