= Nailan =

- Location within Azad Kashmir
- Coordinates: 33.30°N 74.3°E
- Sovereign state: Pakistan
- Dependent territory: Azad Kashmir
- Time zone: UTC+5 (PST)

Nailan is a union council in Kotli District, Azad Kashmir. It is located at 33°30'10"N 74°2'60"E. There is no school in the area, so children get their education at the Government Boys High School Dandli and at the Government Girls Middle School Dandli. The temperature in Nailan is generally very low, resulting in Nailan being one of the coldest places in the Kotli District.
