= Maryam Javed =

Pakistani politician

- مریم جاوید

Member of the Azad Kashmir Legislative Assembly
- Incumbent
- Assumed office 24 August 2026
- Preceded by: Muhammad Akmal Sargala
- Constituency: LA-37 Jammu and Others-IV

Personal details
- Party: Pakistan Muslim League (N)

Maryam Javed (Urdu: مریم جاوید) is a Pakistani politician who has been a member of the Azad Kashmir Legislative Assembly since August 2026.

== Political career ==
Javed was elected to the Azad Kashmir Legislative Assembly from LA-37 Jammu and Others-IV as a candidate of Pakistan Muslim League (N) in the 2026 Azad Kashmiri general election. She received 28,547 votes, and defeated Usman Aleem of Jammu Kashmir United Movement, who received 22,937 votes.
