= LA-11 Kotli-IV =

Electoral district in Azad Jammu and Kashmir

- Constituency for the Azad Kashmir Legislative Assembly
- District: Kotli District
- Electorate: 105,827

Current constituency
- Party: Pakistan Tehreek-e-Insaf
- Member: Chaudhry Muhammad Ikhlaq
- Created from: LA-10 Kotli-III

LA-11 Kotli-IV is a constituency of the Azad Kashmir Legislative Assembly which is currently represented by Chaudhry Muhammad Ikhlaq of the Pakistan Tehreek-e-Insaf (PTI). It covers the area of Sehnsa Tehsil in Kotli District.

== Election 2016 ==
General elections were held on 21 July 2016.

General election 2016: LA-10 Kotli-III
Party	Candidate	Votes	%	±%
PML(N)	Raja Muhammad Nasser	34,442		
PTI	Chaudry Muhammad Ikhlaq	21,546		
PPP	Chaudry Mazhar Hussain	1,723		
Pakistan Tehreek-e-Insaf Nazariati	Raja Muhammad Tajamul	315		
Sunni Ittehad Council	Sardar Abdur Rehman Khan	168		
Independent	Abid Hussain	107		
Turnout		58,301		

== Election 2021 ==
General elections were held on 25 July 2021.

General election 2021: LA-11 Kotli-IV
Party	Candidate	Votes	%	±%
PTI	Chaudhry Muhammad Ikhlaq	25,201	36.75	
PML(N)	Raja Muhammad Naseer	24,288	35.42	
AJKMC	Raja Iftikhar Hussain	7,090	10.34	
PPP	Sardar Muhammad Bashir Pelwan	5,577	8.13	
TLP	Muhammad Habib	4,564	6.65	
Others	Others (nine candidates)	1,861	2.71	
Turnout		68,581	64.80	
Majority		913	1.33	
Registered electors		105,827		
PTI gain from PML(N)				

== Election 2026 ==
General elections were held on 27 July 2026. Raja Muhammad Asif Khan of Pakistan Muslim League (N) (PML(N)) won the election with 26,758 votes.

General election 2026: LA-11 Kotli-IV
Party	Candidate	Votes	%	±%
PML(N)	Raja Muhammad Asif Khan	26,758	49.40	▲13.98
PPP	Chaudhry Muhammad Ikhlaq	22,174	40.94	▲32.81
IPP	Muhammad Talib Khan	1,888	3.49	
Independent	Majid Razzaq Khan	1,049	1.94	
Others	Others (twenty candidates)	2,297	4.24	
Turnout		54,269	43.53	▼21.27
Total valid votes		54,166	99.81	
Rejected ballots		103	0.19	
Majority		4,584	8.46	
Registered electors		124,664		
PML(N) gain from PTI				
