= Hajira =

Hajira may refer to:

- Hajira, Azad Kashmir, a town in Pakistan
- Hazira, a suburb and a transshipment port in India
