= Sardar Farooq Ahmed Tahir =

Pakistani politician

Deputy Speaker of the Azad Kashmir Legislative Assembly
- In office 30 July 2016 – 3 November 2018
- Speaker: Shah Ghulam Qadir
- Preceded by: Shaheen Kausar Dar
- Succeeded by: Aamir Altaf Khan
- In office 25 July 2006 – 17 January 2009
- Speaker: Shah Ghulam Qadir
- Succeeded by: Muhammad Saleem Butt

Minister for Law, Azad Kashmir
- In office 3 November 2018 – 3 August 2021
- Prime Minister: Raja Farooq Haider Khan
- Preceded by: Chaudhry Javed Akhtar

Member of the Azad Kashmir Legislative Assembly
- In office March 2014 – 3 August 2021
- Preceded by: Akhtar Hussain Rabbani
- Succeeded by: Faheem Akhtar Rabbani
- Constituency: LA-22 Poonch & Sudhnoti-VI
- In office 24 July 2006 – 25 July 2011
- Preceded by: Akhtar Hussain Rabbani
- Succeeded by: Akhtar Hussain Rabbani
- Constituency: LA-22 Poonch & Sudhnoti-VI

Personal details
- Party: Pakistan Muslim League (N) (2011-present)
- Other political affiliations: All Jammu and Kashmir Muslim Conference (2006-2011)
- Occupation: Politician

Sardar Farooq Ahmed Tahir is a Pakistani politician who served as the Deputy Speaker of the Azad Kashmir Legislative Assembly from July 2016 to November 2018. He also served as the region's Minister for Law, Justice, and Parliamentary Affairs from November 2018 to August 2021. He belongs to PML-N. He also served as a member of the Assembly from July 2006 to July 2011 and from 2014 to August 2021.

== Political career ==
Tahir was elected to the Azad Kashmir Legislative Assembly from LA-22 Poonch & Sudhnoti-VI as a candidate of All Jammu and Kashmir Muslim Conference (AJKMC) in the 2006 Azad Kashmiri general election.

After taking oath as a member on 25 July 2006, he was elected to the position of Deputy Speaker of the Assembly. He defeated Sardar Ghulam Sadiq, a candidate of Pakistan People's Party (PPP).

On 17 January 2009, he was voted out of the position of Deputy Speaker through a vote of no-confidence. 30 out of 47 members in the Assembly voted in favor of the motion.

On 29 October 2009, he was sworn into the cabinet of Prime Minister Raja Farooq Haider Khan as Minister for Information and Information Technology.

On 12 August 2010, he was sworn into the cabinet of Prime Minister Attique Ahmed Khan as Minister for Education.

He contested the 2011 Azad Kashmiri general election from LA-22 Poonch & Sudhnoti-VI as a candidate of AJKMC, but was unsuccessful. He was defeated by Akhtar Hussain Rabbani, a candidate of PPP.

On 22 February 2014, he was re-elected to the Assembly from LA-22 Poonch & Sudhnoti-VI as a candidate of Pakistan Muslim League (N) (PML(N)) in a by-election. He received 23,724 votes and defeated Fahim Akhtar Rabbani, a candidate of PPP.

He was re-elected to the Assembly from LA-22 Poonch & Sudhnoti-VI as a candidate of PML(N) in the 2016 Azad Kashmiri general election. He received 26,270 votes and defeated Fahim Akhtar Rabbani, a candidate of PPP.

After taking oath as a member on 30 July 2016, he was elected to the position of Deputy Speaker of the Assembly. He received 39 votes and defeated Saghir Chugtai, a candidate of AJKMC, and Shazia Akbar, a candidate of PPP, who received 5 and 4 votes, respectively.

On 3 November 2018, he was sworn into the cabinet of Prime Minister Raja Farooq Haider Khan, and was made the Minister for Law, Justice, and Parliamentary Affairs. As a result, he ceased to hold the office of Deputy Speaker.

He contested the 2021 Azad Kashmiri general election from LA-24 Poonch & Sudhnoti-VII as a candidate of PML(N), but was unsuccessful. He received 24,103 votes and was defeated by Fahim Akhtar Rabbani, a candidate of Pakistan Tehreek-e-Insaf (PTI).
