= Chaudhary Mohammad Akbar Ibrahim =

Politician from Azad Jammu and Kashmir

Chaudhry Mohammad Akbar Ibrahim
- چوہدری محمد اكبر ابراہيم

Member of the Azad Jammu and Kashmir Legislative Assembly
- In office 3 August 2021 – 24 August 2026
- Succeeded by: Choudhary Zeeshan Younas Tanda
- Constituency: LA-38 Jammu and Others-V
- In office 25 July 2011 – 30 July 2016
- Preceded by: Himself
- Succeeded by: Chaudhry Javed Akhtar
- Constituency: LA-34 Jammu and Others-V
- In office 24 July 2006 – 25 July 2011
- Preceded by: Chaudhry Javed Akhtar
- Succeeded by: Himself
- Constituency: LA-34 Jammu and Others-V

Minister for Food, Azad Kashmir
- In office 25 June 2023 – 17 October 2025
- Prime Minister: Chaudhry Anwarul Haq
- In office August 2010 – 25 July 2011
- Prime Minister: Attique Ahmed Khan

Advisor for Civil Defense and Disaster Management, Azad Kashmir
- In office 26 August 2021 – 14 April 2022
- Prime Minister: Abdul Qayyum Khan Niazi

Minister for Trade and Industries, Azad Kashmir
- In office 2 August 2011 – 12 April 2016
- Prime Minister: Chaudhry Abdul Majid

Minister for Rehabilitation, Azad Kashmir
- In office January 2009 – 22 October 2009
- Prime Minister: Muhammad Yaqoob Khan

Minister for Tourism, Wildlife, and Environment, Azad Kashmir
- In office 7 August 2006 – 6 January 2009
- Prime Minister: Attique Ahmed Khan

Personal details
- Party: Pakistan Muslim League (Q) (2026-present)
- Other political affiliations: Pakistan Tehreek-e-Insaf (2021-2026); Independent (2001-2021)

Chaudhry Mohammad Akbar Ibrahim (Urdu: چوہدری محمد اكبر ابراہيم), is a Pakistani politician from Azad Kashmir. He served as a member of the Azad Kashmir Legislative Assembly from July 2006 to July 2011, from July 2011 to July 2016, and from August 2021 to August 2026.

He also previously served as the Minister for Food from June 2023 to October 2025 and from August 2010 to July 2011, as the Advisor for Civil Defense and Disaster Management from August 2021 to April 2022, as the Minister for Trade and Industries from August 2011 to April 2016, as the Minister for Rehabilitation from January 2009 to October 2009, and as the Minister for Tourism, Wildlife, and Environment from August 2006 to January 2009.

== Political career ==
Ibrahim contested the 2001 Azad Kashmiri general election from LA-34 Jammu and Others-V as an independent candidate, but was unsuccessful. He was supported by Pakistan Muslim League (Q) (PML(Q)), and was defeated by Chaudhry Javed Akhtar, a candidate of Pakistan People's Party (PPP).

He was elected to the Azad Kashmir Legislative Assembly from LA-34 Jammu and Others-V as an independent candidate in the 2006 Azad Kashmiri general election. He was supported by PML(Q).

On 7 August 2006, he was inducted into the cabinet of Prime Minister Attique Ahmed Khan as the Minister for Tourism, Wildlife and Environment. He remained in this role until the fall of Ahmed Khan's government on 6 January 2009.

In January 2009, he was inducted into the cabinet of Prime Minister Muhammad Yaqoob Khan as the Minister for Rehabilitation. He remained in this role until the fall of Yaqoob Khan's government on 22 October 2009.

In August 2010, he was inducted into the cabinet of Prime Minister Attique Ahmed Khan as the Minister for Food. He remained in this position until the expiry of the assembly's five-year term on 25 July 2011.

He was re-elected to the Azad Kashmir Legislative Assembly from LA-34 Jammu and Others-V as an independent candidate in the 2011 Azad Kashmiri general election. He was supported by PML(Q), PPP, and All Jammu and Kashmir Muslim Conference (AJKMC). He defeated Chaudhry Javed Akhtar, a candidate of Pakistan Muslim League (N) (PML(N)).

On 2 August 2011, he was inducted into the cabinet of Prime Minister Chaudhry Abdul Majid as the Minister for Trade and Industries. He was removed from the cabinet on 12 April 2016, for seeking to contest the next elections as a candidate of PML(N).

He contested the 2016 Azad Kashmiri general election from LA-34 Jammu and Others-V as an independent candidate, but was unsuccessful. He received 10,966 votes and was defeated by Chaudhry Javed Akhtar, a candidate of PML(N).

He was re-elected to the Azad Kashmir Legislative Assembly from LA-38 Jammu and Others-V as a candidate of Pakistan Tehreek-e-Insaf (PTI) in the 2021 Azad Kashmiri general election. He received 12,219 votes and defeated Choudhary Zeeshan Younas Tanda, a candidate of PML(N).

On 26 August 2021, he was inducted into the cabinet of Prime Minister Abdul Qayyum Khan Niazi as the Advisor for Civil Defense and Disaster Management. He was removed from the cabinet on 14 April 2022.

On 25 June 2023, he was inducted into the cabinet of Prime Minister Chaudhry Anwarul Haq as the Minister for Food. He resigned from the cabinet on 17 October 2025.

He contested the 2026 Azad Kashmiri general election from LA-38 Jammu and Others-V as a candidate of PML(Q), but was unsuccessful. He received 9,523 votes and was defeated by Choudhary Zeeshan Younas Tanda, a candidate of PML(N).
