= Raja Muhammad Siddique Khan =

Pakistani politician

- راجہ محمد صدیق خان

Member of the Azad Kashmir Legislative Assembly
- Incumbent
- Assumed office 24 July 2006
- Preceded by: Raja Mujahid Khan
- Constituency: LA-39 Jammu and Others-VI (2021-present); LA-35 Jammu and Others-VI (2006-2021)

Personal details
- Party: Pakistan Muslim League (N) (2011-present)
- Other political affiliations: All Jammu and Kashmir Muslim Conference (2006-2011)

Raja Muhammad Siddique Khan (Urdu: راجہ محمد صدیق خان) is a Pakistani politician who has been a member of the Azad Kashmir Legislative Assembly since July 2006.

== Political career ==
Khan was elected to the Azad Kashmir Legislative Assembly from LA-35 Jammu and Others-VI as a candidate of All Jammu and Kashmir Muslim Conference (AJKMC) in the 2006 Azad Kashmiri general election.

On 14 January 2009, he was sworn into the cabinet of Prime Minister Muhammad Yaqoob Khan as Minister for Transport, Civil Defence, and Animal Husbandry. He resigned on 13 October 2009.

On 29 October 2009, he was sworn into the cabinet of Prime Minister Raja Farooq Haider Khan as Minister for Azad Kashmir Logging and Sawmills Corporation and Azad Kashmir Mineral and Industrial Development Corporation.

He was re-elected to the Assembly from LA-35 Jammu and Others-VI as a candidate of Pakistan Muslim League (N) (PML(N)) in the 2011 Azad Kashmiri general election.

He was re-elected to the Assembly from LA-35 Jammu and Others-VI as a candidate of PML(N) in the 2016 Azad Kashmiri general election. He received 11,058 votes and defeated Chaudhry Fakhar Zaman, a candidate of Pakistan People's Party (PPP).

On 14 April 2018, he was sworn into the cabinet of Prime Minister Raja Farooq Haider Khan, and was made the Minister for Rehabilitation.

He was re-elected to the Assembly from LA-39 Jammu and Others-VI as a candidate of PML(N) in the 2021 Azad Kashmiri general election. He received 9,557 votes and defeated Nazia Niaz, a candidate of Pakistan Tehreek-e-Insaf (PTI).

On 25 June 2023, he was sworn into the cabinet of Prime Minister Chaudhry Anwarul Haq, and was made the Minister for Industry, Commerce, Labour Welfare, Sericulture and Printing Press.

He was re-elected to the Assembly from LA-39 Jammu and Others-VI as a candidate of PML(N) in the 2026 Azad Kashmiri general election. He received 10,981 votes, while the runner-up, Chaudhry Fakhar Zaman of PPP, received 5,081 votes.
