= Chaudhry Muhammad Razzaq =

Pakistani politician

- چوہدری محمد رزاق

Member of the Azad Kashmir Legislative Assembly
- Incumbent
- Assumed office 24 August 2026
- Preceded by: Chaudhry Ali Shan Soni
- Constituency: LA-6 Bhimber-II

Personal details
- Party: Pakistan Muslim League (N) (2026-present)
- Other political affiliations: Pakistan People's Party (2011-2016); Pakistan Tehreek-e-Insaf (2016-2021); Independent (2021-2026)

Chaudhry Muhammad Razzaq (Urdu: چوہدری محمد رزاق) is a Pakistani politician who has been a member of the Azad Kashmir Legislative Assembly since August 2026.

== Political career ==
Razzaq contested the 2011 Azad Kashmiri general election from LA-6 Bhimber-II as a candidate of Pakistan People's Party (PPP), but was unsuccessful. He was defeated by Chaudhry Ali Shan Soni, an independent candidate.

He contested the 2016 Azad Kashmiri general election from LA-6 Bhimber-II as a candidate of Pakistan Tehreek-e-Insaf (PTI), but was unsuccessful. He was defeated by Chaudhry Ali Shan Soni, an independent candidate.

He contested the 2021 Azad Kashmiri general election from LA-6 Bhimber-II as an independent candidate, but was unsuccessful. He received 11,281 votes and was defeated by Chaudhry Ali Shan Soni, a candidate of PTI.

He was elected to the Azad Kashmir Legislative Assembly from LA-6 Bhimber-II as a candidate of the Pakistan Muslim League (N) (PML(N)) in the 2026 Azad Kashmiri general election. He received 32,732 votes, while the runner-up, Chaudhry Ali Shan Soni of the Istehkam-e-Pakistan Party, received 26,718 votes.
