= Choudhary Zeeshan Younas Tanda =

Pakistani politician

- چوہدری ذیشان یونس ٹانڈہ

Member of the Azad Kashmir Legislative Assembly
- Incumbent
- Assumed office 24 August 2026
- Preceded by: Chaudhary Mohammad Akbar Ibrahim
- Constituency: LA-38 Jammu and Others-V

Personal details
- Party: Pakistan Muslim League (N)

Choudhary Zeeshan Younas Tanda (Urdu: چوہدری ذیشان یونس ٹانڈہ) is a Pakistani politician who has been a member of the Azad Kashmir Legislative Assembly since August 2026.

== Political career ==
Tanda contested the 2021 Azad Kashmiri general election from LA-38 Jammu and Others-V as a candidate of Pakistan Muslim League (N) (PML(N)), but was unsuccessful. He received 8,754 votes and was defeated by Chaudhary Mohammad Akbar Ibrahim, a candidate of Pakistan Tehreek-e-Insaf (PTI).

Tanda was elected to the Azad Kashmir Legislative Assembly from LA-38 Jammu and Others-V as a candidate of PML(N) in the 2026 Azad Kashmiri general election. He received 13,652 votes, while the runner-up, Chaudhary Mohammad Akbar Ibrahim of Pakistan Muslim League (Q) (PML(Q)), received 9,523 votes.
