= Raja Ayaz Ahmed Khan =

Pakistani politician

- راجہ ایاز احمد خان

Member of the Azad Kashmir Legislative Assembly
- Incumbent
- Assumed office 24 August 2026
- Preceded by: Nisar Ansar Abdali
- Constituency: LA-13 Kotli-VI

Personal details
- Party: Pakistan Muslim League (N) (PML-N)

Raja Ayaz Ahmed Khan (Urdu: راجہ ایاز احمد خان) is a Pakistani politician who has been a member of the Azad Kashmir Legislative Assembly since August 2026.

== Political career ==
Ayaz contested the 2021 Azad Kashmiri general election from LA-13 Kotli-VI as a candidate of Pakistan Muslim League (N) (PML(N)), but was unsuccessful. He placed third and was defeated by Nisar Ansar Abdali, a candidate of Pakistan Tehreek-e-Insaf (PTI).

He was elected to the Azad Kashmir Legislative Assembly from LA-13 Kotli-VI as a candidate of PML(N) in the 2026 Azad Kashmiri general election. He received 21,284 votes, while the runner-up, Nisar Ansar Abdali of Istehkam-e-Pakistan Party (IPP), received 15,892 votes.
