= Panjera =

Town in Pakistan

Coordinates: 33°34′N 73°50′E

Panjera is a historic town in Kotli District in Azad Kashmir. The town lies in the foothills of Himalayas with subtropical microclimate. The area has two flowing streams originating from Sudhanoti district of Azad Kashmir. The town is a typical example of compact market. The economy is predominantly agriculture based with wheat and maize as major crops. Black mulberry is also common with other horticultural crops. Religious festivals are popular and horse riding, tent pegging, horse race and dance are the popular in festivals. Kabaddi is a popular sport, alongside cricket and volleyball.

The area's biodiversity includes flora and fauna such as leopards, pheasants, pangolins, porcupines, foxes, jackals, peacocks and snakes. Many bird species and reptiles are also seen in the region. Mashair fish is found in the streams flowing in Panjera.
