= Jammu and Kashmir Awami Dast-o-Bazu =

Political party in Azad Kashmir, Pakistan

Jammu and Kashmir Awami Dast-o-Bazu جموں و کشمیر عوامی دست و بازو Jammu and Kashmir People's Hand and Arm
- Abbreviation: JKADB
- Chairman: Sajid Iqbal Abbasi
- Founder: Sajid Iqbal Abbasi
- Founded: 21 May 2026; 3 months ago
- Headquarters: Dhirkot, Azad Kashmir
- Ideology: Welfarism; Kashmir unification with Pakistan
- Colors: Green; Yellow
- Slogan: Waqaar, Ittihaad, Ikhtiyaar (lit. 'Dignity, Unity, Empowerment')
- AJK Assembly: 1 / 53

Election symbol
- Human hand

Website
- Official website

The Jammu and Kashmir Awami Dast-o-Bazu (Urdu: جموں و کشمیر عوامی دست و بازو, , lit. 'Jammu and Kashmir People's Hand and Arm') is a political party in Azad Jammu and Kashmir.

== History ==
The party was registered with the Azad Jammu and Kashmir Election Commission on 21 May 2026.

It contested the 2026 Azad Kashmiri general election, where it won one seat. Its founding chairman, Sajid Iqbal Abbasi, was elected to the Azad Kashmir Legislative Assembly from LA-14 Bagh-I, defeating Attique Ahmed Khan, a former Prime Minister of Azad Kashmir. He was also supported by Jamaat-e-Islami, Pakistan Tehreek-e-Insaf, and Jammu Kashmir Liberation League.

On 17 August 2026, Abbasi announced that JKADB would ally with Pakistan Muslim League (N) (PML(N)) in the new term of the Assembly after the 2026 elections.

== See also ==
- List of political parties in Pakistan
