= Syed Bazil Ali Naqvi =

Pakistani politician

- سید بازل علی نقوی

Member of the Azad Kashmir Legislative Assembly
- Incumbent
- Assumed office 3 August 2021
- Preceded by: Chaudhary Shahzad Mehmood
- Constituency: LA-28 Muzaffarabad-II

Personal details
- Party: Pakistan People's Party

Syed Bazil Ali Naqvi (Urdu: سید بازل علی نقوی) is a Pakistani politician who has been a member of the Azad Kashmir Legislative Assembly since August 2021.

== Political career ==
He was elected to the Azad Kashmir Legislative Assembly from LA-28 Muzaffarabad-II as a candidate of Pakistan People's Party (PPP) in the 2021 Azad Kashmiri general election. He received 26,011 votes and defeated Chaudhry Shahzad Mahmood, a candidate of Pakistan Tehreek-e-Insaf (PTI).

On 25 June 2023, he was sworn into the cabinet of Prime Minister Chaudhry Anwarul Haq, and was made the Minister for Social Welfare and Women Development.

On 19 November 2025, he was sworn into the cabinet of Prime Minister Faisal Mumtaz Rathore, and was made the Minister for Health and Population Welfare.

He was re-elected to the Assembly from LA-28 Muzaffarabad-II as a candidate of PPP in the 2026 Azad Kashmiri general election. He received 27,731 votes, while the runner-up, Chaudhry Shahzad Mahmood of the Pakistan Muslim League (N), received 26,518 votes.
