= Dahana, Pakistan =

Town in Kotli, Azad Kashmir

Coordinates: 33°24′44″N 73°59′57″E

Dahana is a town of Khuiretta subdivision of Kotli District, Azad Kashmir, Pakistan. The town is on the Nail River, and has all the basic facilities, such as a health care center, banks, a library, schools, and transportation services.
