= Syed Shaukat Ali Shah =

Pakistani politician

- سید شوکت علی شاہ

Member of the Azad Kashmir Legislative Assembly
- Incumbent
- Assumed office 24 August 2026
- Preceded by: Muhammad Asim Sharif
- Constituency: LA-42 Kashmir Valley-III
- In office 24 July 2001 – 3 August 2021
- Succeeded by: Muhammad Asim Sharif
- Constituency: LA-38 Kashmir Valley-III (2006-2021); LA-37 Kashmir Valley-III (2001-2006)

Personal details
- Party: Pakistan Muslim League (N) (2011-present)
- Other political affiliations: All Jammu and Kashmir Muslim Conference (2001-2011)

Syed Shaukat Ali Shah (Urdu: سید شوکت علی شاہ) is a Pakistani politician who has been a member of the Azad Kashmir Legislative Assembly since August 2026. He previously served as a member of the Assembly from 2001 to August 2021.

== Political career ==
Shah was elected to the Azad Kashmir Legislative Assembly from LA-37 Kashmir Valley-III as a candidate of All Jammu and Kashmir Muslim Conference (AJKMC) in the 2001 Azad Kashmiri general election.

He was re-elected to the Assembly from LA-38 Kashmir Valley-III as a candidate of AJKMC in the 2006 Azad Kashmiri general election.

On 14 January 2009, he was sworn into the cabinet of Prime Minister Muhammad Yaqoob Khan, and was made the Minister for Food.

On 29 October 2009, he was sworn into the cabinet of Prime Minister Raja Farooq Haider Khan, and was made the Minister for Food.

He was re-elected to the Assembly from LA-38 Kashmir Valley-III as a candidate of Pakistan Muslim League (N) (PML(N)) in the 2011 Azad Kashmiri general election.

He was re-elected to the Assembly from LA-38 Kashmir Valley-III as a candidate of PML(N) in the 2016 Azad Kashmiri general election. He received 1,082 votes and defeated Syed Muhammad Shah, a candidate of Pakistan Tehreek-e-Insaf (PTI).

On 1 December 2016, he was sworn into the cabinet of Prime Minister Raja Farooq Haider Khan, and was made the Minister for Food and Food Authority.

He contested the 2021 Azad Kashmiri general election from LA-42 Kashmir Valley-III as a candidate of PML(N), but was unsuccessful. He received 1,205 votes and was defeated by Muhammad Asim Sharif, a candidate of Pakistan Tehreek-e-Insaf (PTI), who received 1,254 votes.

He was re-elected to the Assembly from LA-42 Kashmir Valley-III as a candidate of PML(N) in the 2026 Azad Kashmiri general election. He received 1,524 votes, while the runner-up, Muhammad Asim Sharif of the Pakistan Peoples Party, received 477 votes.
