= Throchi Fort =

Fort in Azad Kashmir, Pakistan

Throchi Fort تھروچی قلعہ
- Interactive map of Throchi Fort تھروچی قلعہ
- Location: Kotli District, Pakistan

Site notes
- Architectural styles: Indo-Islamic, Mughal

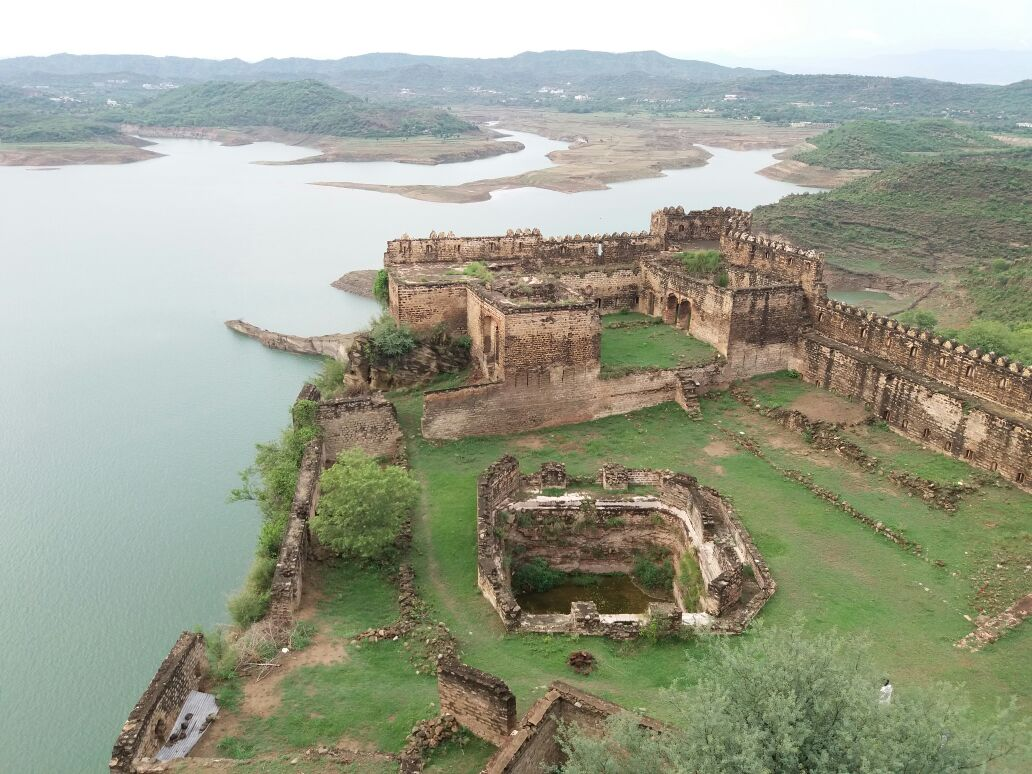
Throchi Fort in 2017

Throchi Fort (Urdu: تھروچی قلعہ) is a historical fort in Throchi village, Choroi Tehsil of Kotli district in Azad Jammu and Kashmir. From distance of 3 kilometres (1.9 mi) east of Gulpur village, the fort is situated on a hilltop overlooking the village and surrounding areas.

== History ==
No original details regarding the construction and the founder of Throchi Fort could be found. According to research conducted under the Taxila Institute of Asian Civilisations, Throchi Fort was originally constructed by the Mangral Rajputs, under the leadership of Nasir-Din Khan. The local claims include the name Throchi comes from the name of a prominent Hindu personality of that time. However it is considered that the fort was constructed between 1425 and 1460, when this region was under control of Jasrat, a Khokhar or Gakhar chieftain. It was strategically positioned to protect the hamlet and its surrounding from prospective invasions and attacks.

Throchi Fort changed hands several times as political power shifted in the region. It fell to the Sikhs during the rule of Maharaja Ranjit Singh and later passed to Maharaja Gulab Singh in 1855, who rebuilt it in stone. Under Dogra rule from 1846 to 1947 the fort housed small garrisons and served as a storage site for weapons and communications equipment.

During the uprising of 1947 the fort became a major center of fighting. Major Nasarullah and Muslim soldiers captured the fort after eliminating the Gorkha garrison led by Captain Raghubir Singh. Nearby operations were directed by Colonel Sher Ahmad Khan, and the Dogra forces eventually surrendered to a local group commanded by Colonel Mahmood Mangral.

After independence the fort came under the control of the Pakistan Army. It is currently managed by the Pakistan Army and contains a control room and signals tower of the Special Communication Organization, a telecommunications network active in Azad Kashmir. The structure is now in poor condition and requires urgent preservation.
