= Teenda =

Town in Azad Kashmir, Pakistan

Chowki Tinda چوکى ٹنڈا
- Town
- Country: Pakistan
- Territory: Azad Jammu and Kashmir
- District: Kotli District
- Time zone: UTC+5 (PST)

Chowki Tinda is a town in Kotli District, Azad Kashmir, Pakistan.

This union council has five villages namely Kakanni Bagah, Dikhari, Chowki Tinda, Kalah Athroin, and Pnakha. It is located 6 kilometres from Kotli city and is linked to it with a metalled road.

== Educational institutions ==
There are several educational institutes in Union Council Chowki Tinda. They include six government and four private-sector institutes. Notable ones include:

- Govt. Boys High School Malhar
- Girls High School Malhar
- Green Land Public Secondary School Chowki Kalah
