= Chaudhry Muhammad Ismail Gujjar =

Pakistani politician

- چوہدری محمد اسماعیل گجر

Member of the Azad Kashmir Legislative Assembly
- Incumbent
- Assumed office 24 August 2026
- Preceded by: Maqbool Ahmed Gujjar
- Constituency: LA-35 Jammu and Others-II
- In office 22 January 2024 – 22 April 2026
- Preceded by: Maqbool Ahmed Gujjar
- Succeeded by: Maqbool Ahmed Gujjar
- Constituency: LA-35 Jammu and Others-II
- In office 24 July 2006 – 3 August 2021
- Preceded by: Maqbool Ahmed Gujjar
- Succeeded by: Maqbool Ahmed Gujjar
- Constituency: LA-31 Jammu and Others-II

Personal details
- Party: Pakistan Muslim League (N) (2011-present)
- Other political affiliations: All Jammu and Kashmir Muslim Conference (2006-2011)

Chaudhry Muhammad Ismail Gujjar (Urdu: چوہدری محمد اسماعیل گجر) is a Pakistani politician who has been a member of the Azad Kashmir Legislative Assembly since August 2026. He previously served as a member of the Assembly from January 2024 to April 2026 and from July 2006 to August 2021.

== Political career ==
Gujjar contested the 2001 Azad Kashmiri general election from LA-31 Jammu and Others-II as a candidate of All Jammu and Kashmir Muslim Conference (AJKMC), but was unsuccessful. After re-polling at one polling station, he received 137 votes fewer than Maqbool Ahmed Gujjar, a candidate of Pakistan People's Party (PPP). He challenged the re-polling, which was ordered by the Chief Election Commissioner, before an election tribunal. His challenge was accepted on 24 December 2002, and he was subsequently notified as the victor. However, his rival challenged the notification before the Supreme Court, which suspended the tribunal's order on 27 December 2002. On 10 March 2003, the Supreme Court accepted the appeal and set aside the tribunal's order, declaring that the CEC had powers, under the Azad Jammu and Kashmir Legislative Assembly Election Ordinance 1970, to hold re-polling.

He was elected to the Azad Kashmir Legislative Assembly from LA-31 Jammu and Others-II as a candidate of AJKMC in the 2006 Azad Kashmiri general election.

On 6 March 2008, he was appointed to the cabinet of Prime Minister Attique Ahmed Khan, and was made the Special Assistant for Political Affairs, Prisons, and Labour. The cabinet was dissolved and re-constituted on 11 December 2008, and he was re-appointed as a Special Assistant.

On 29 October 2009, he was sworn into the cabinet of Prime Minister Raja Farooq Haider Khan as Minister for Rehabilitation and Civil Defence.

On 12 August 2010, he was sworn into the cabinet of Prime Minister Attique Ahmed Khan as Minister for Rehabilitation and Civil Defence.

In 2011, he joined Pakistan Muslim League (N) (PML(N)).

He was re-elected to the Assembly from LA-31 Jammu and Others-II as a candidate of PML(N) in the 2011 Azad Kashmiri general election. He defeated Chaudhry Maqbool of Pakistan People's Party (PPP) and Waheed-ul-Haq Kashmiri of AJKMC.

He was re-elected to the Assembly from LA-31 Jammu and Others-II as a candidate of PML(N) in the 2016 Azad Kashmiri general election.

On 8 September 2018, he was sworn into the cabinet of Prime Minister Raja Farooq Haider Khan as the Minister for Animal Husbandry and Dairy Development.

He contested the 2021 Azad Kashmiri general election from LA-35 Jammu and Others-II as a candidate of PML(N), but was unsuccessful. He received 16,885 votes and was defeated by Maqbool Ahmed Gujjar, a candidate of Pakistan Tehreek-e-Insaf (PTI).

He challenged the results of the election before an election tribunal and in October 2023, his challenge was accepted. The tribunal directed the Election Commission to hold fresh elections in the constituency. He and his opponent both challenged this decision in the Supreme Court, and both of their appeals were clubbed together. A recount was agreed by both candidates, which was held on 20 January 2024 and saw Ismail Gujjar declared the victor. He took oath as a member of the Assembly on 22 January 2024. Ahmed Gujjar challenged this before an election tribunal which rejected his petition on 19 June 2025. He then appealed the decision before the Supreme Court, which re-instated him as a member of the Assembly on 22 April 2026.

He was re-elected to the Assembly from LA-35 Jammu and Others-II as a candidate of PML(N) in the 2026 Azad Kashmiri general election. He received 23,893 votes, while the runner-up Independent candidate, Sardar Muhammad Ghiyas, received 5,868 votes.
