= Raja Muhammad Asif Khan =

Pakistani politician

- راجہ محمد آصف خان

Member of the Azad Kashmir Legislative Assembly
- Incumbent
- Assumed office 24 August 2026
- Preceded by: Chaudhry Muhammad Akhlaq
- Constituency: LA-11 Kotli-IV

Personal details
- Party: Pakistan Muslim League (N) (PML-N)

Raja Muhammad Asif Khan (Urdu: راجہ محمد آصف خان) is a Pakistani politician who has been a member of the Azad Kashmir Legislative Assembly since August 2026. He is the son of former minister the late Raja Naseer Khan.

== Political career ==
Asif was elected to the Azad Kashmir Legislative Assembly from LA-11 Kotli-IV as a candidate of Pakistan Muslim League (N) (PML(N)) in the 2026 Azad Kashmiri general election. He received 26,758 votes, while the runner-up, Chaudhry Muhammad Akhlaq of Pakistan People's Party (PPP), received 22,174 votes.
