= Noreen Arif =

Pakistani politician

- نورین عارف

Member of the Azad Kashmir Legislative Assembly
- Incumbent
- Assumed office 24 August 2026
- Preceded by: Sardar Muhammad Javed
- Constituency: LA-27 Muzaffarabad-I
- In office 30 July 2016 – 3 August 2021
- Preceded by: Sardar Muhammad Javed
- Succeeded by: Sardar Muhammad Javed
- Constituency: LA-24 Muzaffarabad-I
- In office 30 July 1996 – 25 July 2011
- Constituency: Reserved seat for women
- In office 15 June 1985 – 29 June 1990
- Constituency: Reserved seat for women

Personal details
- Party: Pakistan Muslim League (N)

Noreen Arif (Urdu: نورین عارف) is a Pakistani politician who has been a member of the Azad Kashmir Legislative Assembly since August 2026. She previously served as a member of the Assembly from June 1985 to June 1990, from July 1996 to July 2011 and from July 2016 to August 2021.

== Political career ==
Arif was elected to the Azad Kashmir Legislative Assembly on a reserved seat for women as a candidate of All Jammu and Kashmir Muslim Conference (AJKMC) in the 1985, 1996, and 2001 elections.

On 2 December 2004, she was sworn into the cabinet of Prime Minister Sikandar Hayat Khan, and was made the Advisor for Information. On 16 August 2005, she was made the Minister for Agriculture, Animal Husbandry, Armed Services Board and Civil Defence.

She was re-elected to the Assembly from LA-24 Muzaffarabad-I as an independent candidate in the 2006 Azad Kashmiri general election. She decided to run as an independent as she was refused the AJKMC nomination as the candidate in her constituency. After the election, she, along with three other AJKMC members who were denied nominations, formed the "Haqiqi" group, a breakaway faction of AJKMC.

The "Haqiqi" group virtually ceased to exist when its three members joined the cabinet of Prime Minister Attique Ahmed Khan on 7 March 2008. Arif was made the Minister for Information, Women Development and Cooperatives.

On 14 January 2009, she was sworn into the cabinet of Prime Minister Muhammad Yaqoob Khan, and was made the Minister for Social Welfare, Women Development and Technical Education Vocational Training Authority (TEVTA).

On 29 October 2009, she was sworn into the cabinet of Prime Minister Raja Farooq Haider Khan as Minister for Education and Schools.

She was re-elected to the Assembly from LA-24 Muzaffarabad-I as a candidate of Pakistan Muslim League (N) (PML(N)) in the 2016 Azad Kashmiri general election. She received 19,490 votes and defeated Mir Attiq-ur-Rehman, a candidate of AJKMC.

On 6 August 2016, she was sworn into the cabinet of Prime Minister Raja Farooq Haider Khan, and was made the Minister for Labour, Mineral Resources, Social Welfare, and Women Development. After a cabinet re-shuffle on 7 November 2018, she was made the Minister for Industry and Women Development.

She contested the 2021 Azad Kashmiri general election from LA-27 Muzaffarabad-I as a candidate of PML(N), but was unsuccessful. She was defeated by Sardar Muhammad Javed, a candidate of Pakistan People's Party (PPP).

She was re-elected to the Assembly from LA-27 Muzaffarabad-I as a candidate of PML(N) in the 2026 Azad Kashmiri general election. She received 18,919 votes, while the runner-up, Sardar Tabarak Ali of Istehkam-e-Pakistan Party (IPP), received 18,621 votes.
