= Syed Muhammad Amir Shah =

Pakistani politician

- سید محمد عامر شاہ

Member of the Azad Kashmir Legislative Assembly
- Incumbent
- Assumed office 24 August 2026
- Preceded by: Ghulam Mohiuddin Dewan
- Constituency: LA-41 Kashmir Valley-II

Personal details
- Party: Pakistan Muslim League (N)

Syed Muhammad Amir Shah (Urdu: سید محمد عامر شاہ) is a Pakistani politician who has been a member of the Azad Kashmir Legislative Assembly since August 2026.

== Political career ==
Shah was elected to the Azad Kashmir Legislative Assembly from LA-41 Kashmir Valley-II as a candidate of Pakistan Muslim League (N) (PML(N)) in the 2026 Azad Kashmiri general election. He received 1,804 votes, while the runner-up, independent candidate Saba Dewan, received 588 votes.
