= Sajid Iqbal Abbasi =

Pakistani politician

Sardar Sajid Iqbal Abbasi
- سردار ساجد اقبال عباسی

Member of the Azad Kashmir Legislative Assembly
- Incumbent
- Assumed office 24 August 2026
- Preceded by: Attique Ahmed Khan
- Constituency: LA-14 Bagh-I

Chairman of Jammu and Kashmir Awami Dast-o-Bazu
- Incumbent
- Assumed office 2025
- Preceded by: Party founded

Personal details
- Party: Jammu and Kashmir Awami Dast-o-Bazu

Sardar Sajid Iqbal Abbasi (Urdu: سردار ساجد اقبال عباسی) is a Pakistani politician who has been a member of the Azad Kashmir Legislative Assembly since August 2026. He is also the founder and chairman of Jammu and Kashmir Awami Dast-o-Bazu.

== Political career ==
Abbasi was elected to the Azad Kashmir Legislative Assembly from LA-14 Bagh-I as a candidate of Jammu and Kashmir Awami Dast-o-Bazu (JKADB) in the 2026 Azad Kashmiri general election. He received 40,522 votes and defeated Attique Ahmed Khan, the president of All Jammu and Kashmir Muslim Conference (AJKMC) and former Prime Minister of Azad Kashmir.

On 17 August 2026, he announced that he and JKADB would ally with Pakistan Muslim League (N) (PML(N)) in the new Assembly after the 2026 elections.
