= Muhammad Ahsan Raza =

Pakistani politician

- محمد احسن رضا

Member of the Azad Kashmir Legislative Assembly
- Incumbent
- Assumed office 24 August 2026
- Preceded by: Hafiz Hamid Raza
- Constituency: LA-36 Jammu and Others-III

Personal details
- Party: Pakistan Muslim League (N)

Muhammad Ahsan Raza (Urdu: محمد احسن رضا) is a Pakistani politician who has been a member of the Azad Kashmir Legislative Assembly since August 2026.

== Political career ==
Raza was elected to the Azad Kashmir Legislative Assembly from LA-36 Jammu and Others-III as a candidate of Pakistan Muslim League (N) (PML(N)) in the 2026 Azad Kashmiri general election. He received 27,218 votes, while the runner-up, Ahsan Ismail of Pakistan People's Party, received 12,980 votes.
