= Nisaran Abbasi =

Azad Kashmir politician

Member
- Incumbent
- Assumed office 25 July 2021

Personal details
- Party: AP (2025-present)
- Other political affiliations: PMLN (2021-2025)

Nisaran Abbasi is an Azad Kashmir politician, who is a member of Pakistan Muslim League (N). She was elected to the 10th Assembly of Azad Kashmir on 25 July 2021, taking, unopposed, one of the five seats reserved for women. She has the named role of Advisor to the Prime Minister. She was nominated for the role of Deputy Speaker of the Assembly, but was not successful. While Abbasi received 15 votes, her opponent received 32.Nisara Abbasi – Political and Social Profile

In 2023, following the formation of the coalition government in Azad Jammu and Kashmir, Nisara Abbasi was appointed Chairperson of the Women Parliamentary Caucus of the Azad Jammu and Kashmir Legislative Assembly.

Subsequently, on 26 October 2023, she was appointed as an Adviser to the Government, a position she held for two years.

Throughout her tenure as a Member of the Legislative Assembly and Chairperson of the Women Parliamentary Caucus, she remained actively engaged in advocating for women’s rights, empowerment, and equal representation. One of her significant initiatives was introducing a bill in the Assembly aimed at increasing the quota of seats reserved for women. However, despite her efforts, the proposed legislation could not achieve consensus.

As Chairperson of the Women Parliamentary Caucus, she organized several seminars and awareness programmes to highlight women’s rights, address their challenges, and promote their participation in decision-making processes.

During her two-year tenure as Adviser to the Government, she remained accessible to the public and consistently worked to address people’s concerns and public issues, despite the limited authority and powers associated with her position.

In 2024, she achieved another significant milestone when she became the only representative from Azad Jammu and Kashmir to be appointed as a Member of the National Commission on the Status of Women (NCSW), a position she continues to hold.

Beyond her official responsibilities, Nisara Abbasi continues to be an active and vocal voice in the political and social spheres, advocating for women’s rights, public welfare, social justice, and the concerns of ordinary citizens.
