= Charhoi Tehsil =

Tehsil in Azad Kashmir, Pakistan

Charhoi چرہوئی
- Tehsil
- Location within Azad Kashmir Location within Pakistan
- Coordinates: 33.301°N 73.954°E
- Administering country: Pakistan
- Territory: Azad Kashmir
- Division: Mirpur
- District: Kotli

Area
  - Total: 461 km^{2} (178 sq mi)

Population (2017)
  - Total: 121,054
  - Density: 263/km^{2} (680/sq mi)
- Time zone: UTC+5 (PKT)

Charhoi (Urdu: چرہوئی) is a tehsil of Kotli District in Azad Kashmir, a part of Kashmir administered by Pakistan. It is situated within a forested valley and known for its preservation of traditional plant use. As of the 2017 Pakistani census, the population of Charhoi was 121,054.

== History ==
Indian shells struck homes in the Keri sector of Charhoi on 19 November 2016, resulting in the deaths of four children and the wounding of two others. Three of the dead were killed in the same home. The incident was part of wider border skirmishes between the two nations that year. Chaudhry Mohammad Yasin, the then member of the Azad Kashmir Legislative Assembly for Charhoi, expressed his shock and described the incident as a war crime. Raja Farooq Haider Khan, the then prime minister of Azad Kashmir, also condemned the attack.

Pakistani wildlife officials captured and later released into the wild two rock pythons that had been spotted and reported by villagers in the Gulpur area. The officials were able to quickly respond due to already being at a nearby fish hatchery for World Wildlife Day.

== Administration and geography ==
Charhoi is a tehsil (subdistrict) situated in a valley in Kotli District in Azad Kashmir, a part of Kashmir administered by Pakistan. It is surrounded by tall mountains covered in chir pine (Pinus roxburghii). Covering an area of 461 square kilometres, Charhoi has jurisdiction over 21 villages within its borders.

== Demographics ==
The 2017 Pakistani census recorded 121,054 people living in 17,116 households in Charhoi.

== Ethnobotany ==
Traditional uses of plants for medicine, food, fodder, fuel, and shelter have been preserved by locals and is widely practiced in Charhoi.
