= Kausar Taqdees Gillani =

Azad Kashmir politician

Minister for Azad Kashmir Small industries Co-operation, Travel and Trade Authority
- Incumbent
- Assumed office 23 November 2023

Member
- In office 25 July 2021

Personal details
- Party: IPP (2025-present)
- Other political affiliations: PTI (2021-2023)

Kausar Taqdees Gillani (Urdu: کوثر تقدیس گیلانی نے) is an Azad Kasmir politician, who is a member of Pakistan Tehreek-e-Insaf (PTI). She was elected to the 10th Legislative Assembly of Azad Kashmir on 25 July 2021, taking one of the assembly seats reserved for women. Two other women members of PTI were also elected: Begum Imtiaz Naseem and Sabiha Khatoon. On 23 November 2023 Gillani was sworn in as Minister for Azad Kashmir Small industries Co-operation, Travel and Trade Authority. She is a former chair of the Pakistan Business Forum's Azad Jammu Kashmir Chapter.
