= Bagh Tehsil =

Tehsil in Azad Kashmir, Pakistan

Bagh Tehsil is an administrative subdivision (tehsil) of Bagh District in Azad Kashmir, Pakistan. It is located in the eastern part of the district.

== Administration ==
The tehsil is subdivided into 11 Union Councils, namely:

- Bagh
- Bani Pasari
- Bhount Ghaiyan
- Bir Pani
- Dharra
- Juglari
- Nar Shar Ali Khan
- Rawali
- Swanj
- Thub
- Topi

== History ==
In 2005 the area was badly affected by the earthquake that occurred across the region.
