= Jangian Kotla =

Village in Pakistan

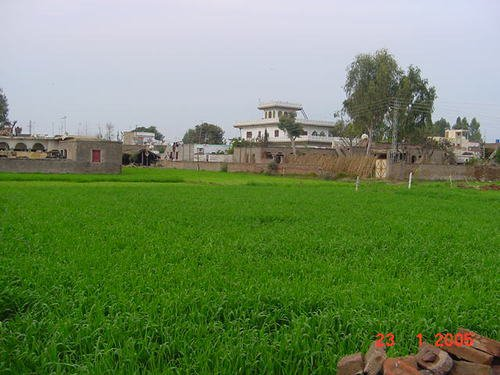
A View of Jangian Kotla.

Jangian Kotla is a village in Azad Kashmir situated between the Upper Jhelum Canal and the Jhelum River in the Khari Sharif locality of Mirpur, Azad Kashmir. The village is located 794 ft. above sea level. The village takes its name from Man Named CH Jangu Baba who was Jaat came from Gujar Khan. Kotla was primarily a residency of Hindu family.

The many people from this village are settled abroad, mainly in the UK, Europe, Middle East and the US. Jangian Kotla has one of the highest literacy rate; and probably has one of the most highly educated and affluent professional residents than any of Azad Kashmir villages.

== Demography ==
According to the 1998 census of Pakistan, the total population of the village was 1,464.
