= Mangral Rajputs =

Mangral
منگرال

Regions with significant populations
- Azad Jammu & Kashmir, Punjab, Jammu and Kashmir (union territory)

Languages
- Pahari-Pothwari

Religion
- Islam

Related ethnic groups
- Pahari people (Kashmir), Punjabis, Hindkowans

The‌ Mangral‌ ‌are a ‌Pothwari-Punjabi Rajput tribe found in Azad Kashmir, Pakistan and Potohar Plateau of Punjab, Pakistan. They belong to the Chandravanshi lineage.

== History ==
They claim to be descended from Raja Mangar Pal, a Raja (Prince). Mangar Pal emigrated from present day Sialkot to Rajauri, Poonch in what is now Jammu and Kashmir. Raja Mangar Pal's descendants settled there and Kotli Mangrallan town emerged. The states of Kotli and Poonch have historically been associated with the Mangrals. Surveys conducted during the British colonial period, as well as modern historians, identify the Mangrals with these states. The Mangrals are also recorded as the former ruling family of Poonch.

The Mangral rule over Kotli State lasted until 1815, when they entered into a settlement after suffering significant loss of life in two earlier battles in 1812 and 1814, led by Raja Shah Sawar Khan against Sikh forces. Under the terms of this agreement, control of Kotli was transferred to Ranjit Singh, while they retained their jagirs from Jammu Raj and continued as landowners and collectors of tax revenue.

=== Pal Rajgan and their conversion to Islam ===
Raja Mangar Pal was reportedly the son of Raja Amna Pal, the last ruler of Rajouri. Raja Amna Pal governed the region till 1194 CE after which he was killed in a revolt by Jarral Rajputs. Mangar Pal is considered to belong to the fifth generation descended from Raja Prithvi Pal, the first formally recorded ruler of Rajouri, who reigned from 968 to 1020 CE. Raja Mangar Pal's son, Raja Sehns Pal, was the first in the lineage to embrace Islam under the influence of Pir Mastan Shah Walli, and subsequent generations continued in the Muslim faith.

The Mangrals are a distinct community with a notable social standing. Although sometimes referred to as Mangral Gakkhars, historical evidence does not support a direct lineage with the Gakkhars.This association may stem from social customs, such as their practice of not marrying their daughters to any tribe except Gakkhars.

A subgroup of the Mangrals is also documented under the alternative name “Manial,” linking their lineage to Raja Amna Pal.

== See also ==
- Mangral
- Throchi Fort
