= Amir Abdul Ghaffar Lone =

Pakistani politician

- عامر عبدالغفار لون

Member of the Azad Kashmir Legislative Assembly
- Incumbent
- Assumed office 30 July 2016
- Preceded by: Muhammad Saleem Butt
- Constituency: LA-40 Kashmir Valley-I (2021-present); LA-36 Kashmir Valley-I (2016-2021)
- In office 24 July 2001 – 24 July 2006
- Preceded by: Sana Ullah Sheikh
- Succeeded by: Muhammad Saleem Butt
- Constituency: LA-35 Kashmir Valley-I

Personal details
- Party: Pakistan People's Party

Amir Abdul Ghaffar Lone (Urdu: عامر عبدالغفار لون) is a Pakistani politician who has been a member of the Azad Kashmir Legislative Assembly since July 2016. He previously served in this position from July 2001 to July 2006.

== Political career ==
Lone was elected to the Azad Kashmir Legislative Assembly from LA-35 Kashmir Valley-I as a candidate of Pakistan People's Party (PPP) in the 2001 Azad Kashmiri general election.

He was re-elected to the Assembly from LA-36 Kashmir Valley-I as a candidate of PPP in the 2016 Azad Kashmiri general election. He received 1,892 votes and defeated Naeem Khan, a candidate of Pakistan Muslim League (N) (PML(N)).

He was re-elected to the Assembly from LA-40 Kashmir Valley-I as a candidate of PPP in the 2021 Azad Kashmiri general election. He received 2,165 votes and defeated Saleem Butt, a candidate of Pakistan Tehreek-e-Insaf (PTI).

On 25 June 2023, he was sworn into the cabinet of Prime Minister Chaudhry Anwarul Haq, and was made the Minister for Environment.

He was re-elected to the Assembly from LA-40 Kashmir Valley-I as a candidate of PPP in the 2026 Azad Kashmiri general election. He received 2,914 votes, while the runner-up, Saleem Butt of the Istehkam-e-Pakistan Party, received 136 votes.

After the election, PPP nominated him for the position of Deputy Speaker of the Assembly, but he was unsuccessful. He received 13 votes, and was defeated by Muhammad Ahmed Raza Qadri of PML(N).
