= LA-13 Kotli-VI =

Electoral district in Azad Jammu and Kashmir

- Constituency for the Azad Kashmir Legislative Assembly
- District: Kotli District
- Electorate: 96,220

Current constituency
- Party: Pakistan Tehreek-e-Insaf
- Member: Nisar Ansar

LA-13 Kotli-VI is a constituency of the Azad Kashmir Legislative Assembly which is currently represented by Nisar Ansar of the Pakistan Tehreek-e-Insaf (PTI). It covers the area of Khuiratta Tehsil in Kotli District.

== Election 2016 ==
General elections were held on 21 July 2016.

General election 2016: LA-12 Kotli-V
Party	Candidate	Votes	%	±%
PML(N)	Raja Nisar Ahmed Khan	22,566	41.26	
PPP	Muhammad Matloob Inqalabi	17,240	31.52	
PTI	Muhammad Rafiq Nayyar	11,602	21.21	
AJKMC	Raja Khursheed Ahmad Khan	3,283	6.00	
KTI	Nasir Latif	0	0.00	
JI	Chaudry Habib Ur Rehman Afaqi	0	0.00	
Public Rights Party	Shakeel Ahmed Hashmi	0	0.00	
Sunni Ittehad Council	Abdul Khaliq	0	0.00	
Independent	Abdul Qayyum Qamar	0	0.00	
Independent	Aqeel Ahmed Raja	0	0.00	
Independent	Nasir Ahmed Raja	0	0.00	
Turnout		54,691		

== Election 2021 ==
General elections were held on 25 July 2021.

General election 2021: LA-13 Kotli-VI
Party	Candidate	Votes	%	±%
PTI	Nisar Ansar	23,340	37.53	▲16.34
PPP	Muhammad Waleed	17,554	28.22	▼3.30
PML(N)	Raja Ayaz Ahmed Khan	10,589	17.03	▼24.23
Independent	Shadab Sikandar Khan	5,794	9.32	▲9.32
TLP	Arslan Fiaz	3,278	5.27	▲5.27
Others	Others (twelve candidates)	1,639	2.64	
Turnout		62,194	64.64	
Majority		5,786	9.30	
Registered electors		96,220		
PTI gain from PML(N)				

== Election 2026 ==
General elections were held on 27 July 2026. Raja Ayaz Ahmed Khan of Pakistan Muslim League (N) (PML(N)) won the election with 21,284votes.

General election: LA-13 Kotli-VI
Party	Candidate	Votes	%	±%
PML(N)	Raja Ayaz Ahmed Khan	21,284	39.73	▲22.70
IPP	Nisar Ansar	15,892	29.67	
PPP	Muhammad Waleed	14,806	27.64	▼0.58
Others	Others (twenty three candidates	1,586	2.96	
Turnout		54,665	47.25	▼17.39
Total valid votes		53,568	97.99	
Rejected ballots		1,097	2.01	
Majority		5,392	10.06	
Registered electors		115,694		
PML(N) gain from PTI				
