= LA-27 Muzaffarabad-I =

Constituency of the Azad Kashmir Legislative Assembly

- Constituency for the Azad Kashmir Legislative Assembly
- District: Muzaffarabad District
- Electorate: 87,706

Current constituency
- Party: Pakistan Muslim League (N)
- Member: Noreen Arif
- Created from: LA-24 Muzaffarabad-I

LA-27 Muzaffarabad-I is a constituency of the Azad Kashmir Legislative Assembly which is currently represented by Noreen Arif of Pakistan Muslim League (N) (PML(N)). It covers most of the area of Khawra in Muzaffarabad District.

== Election 2016 ==
General elections were held on 21 July 2016.

General election 2016: LA-24 Muzaffarabad-I
Party	Candidate	Votes	%	±%
PML(N)	Noreen Arif	19,890		
AJKMC	Mir Atiq ur Rehman	9,918		
PTI	Sardar Tabarak Ali	9,723		
PPP	Sardar Muhammad Javed Khan	9,365		
Independent	Raja Zulqarnain Khan	971		
Independent	Abdul Latif	257		
MQM	Babar Imran Khan	215		
Sunni Tehreek	Syed Saadat Ali Khan	113		
Pakistan Tehreek-e-Insaf Nazariati	Khurshid Ahmad Abbasi	79		
APML	Faizan Ali Chugtai	55		
Independent	Adeel Iqbal	53		
Aam Admi Party	Muhammad Bashir Raja	39		
Independent	Sabir Hussain Awan	37		
Independent	Ishtiaq Ahmad Ishtique	15		
Turnout		50,449		

== Election 2021 ==
General elections were held on 25 July 2021.

General election 2021: LA-27 Muzaffarabad-I
Party	Candidate	Votes	%	±%
PPP	Sardar Muhammad Javed	26,441	43.17	
PTI	Mir Attique ur Rehman	19,677	32.12	
PML(N)	Noreen Arif	9,570	15.62	
AJKMC	Muhammad Saleem Awan	1,282	2.09	
TLP	Mir Farhad Mushtaq	1,220	1.99	
Others	Others (sixteen candidates)	3,064	5.00	
Turnout		61,254	69.84	
Majority		6,764	11.04	
Registered electors		87,706		
PPP gain from PML(N)				

== Election 2026 ==
Elections were held on 2 August 2026. Noreen Arif won the election with 18,919 votes.

General election 2026: LA-27 Muzaffarabad-I
Party	Candidate	Votes	%	±%
PML(N)	Noreen Arif	18,919	32.12	▲16.50
IPP	Sardar Tabarak Ali	18,621	31.61	
PPP	Sardar Muhammad Javed	18,037	30.62	▼12.55
JI	Syed Abdul Samad	828	1.41	
Others	Others	2,497	4.24	
Turnout		59,878	55.93	▼13.91
Total valid votes		58,902	98.37	
Rejected ballots		976	1.63	
Majority		298	0.51	
Registered electors		107,061		
PML(N) gain from PPP				
