= LA-35 Jammu and Others-II =

Constituency of the Azad Kashmir Legislative Assembly

- Constituency for the Azad Kashmir Legislative Assembly
- District: Hafizabad District, Gujranwala District, and Sialkot District (excluding Sialkot Tehsil)
- Electorate: 82,547

Current constituency
- Party: Pakistan Muslim League (N)
- Member: Chaudhry Muhammad Ismail Gujjar
- Created from: LA-31 Jammu and Others-II

LA-35 Jammu and Others-II is a constituency of the Azad Kashmir Legislative Assembly which is currently represented by Chaudhry Muhammad Ismail Gujjar of Pakistan Muslim League (N) (PML(N)). It covers the area of Hafizabad District, Gujranwala District, and Sialkot District (excluding Sialkot Tehsil). Only refugees from Jammu and Ladakh settled in Pakistan are eligible to vote in this constituency.

== Election 2016 ==
General elections were held on 21 July 2016.

General election 2016: LA-31 Jammu and Others-II
Party	Candidate	Votes	%	±%
PML(N)	Chaudhry Muhammad Ismail Gujjar	15,848		
PTI	Maqbool Ahmed Gujjar	8,290		
Independent	Mirza Oman Baig	3,019		
Independent	Malik Muhammad Waris	1,447		
PPP	Chaudhary Khadim Hussain	1,293		
Independent	Sardar Najeeb Akbar Khan	839		
Independent	Sardar Abdur Rehman Khan	631		
KTI	Iftikhar Ahmad	227		
Independent	Muhammad Arif Baig	176		
Independent	Rehmat Ali Aaitmad	119		
Independent	Rasheed Ahmad Sulharia	34		
Independent	Muhammad Arif	33		
Independent	Abdul Qadeer	30		
Independent	Muhammad Iqbal	22		
Independent	Owais Ghulam Nabi	19		
Independent	Muhammad Tariq Ismail	7		
Independent	Samar Subhani	5		
Turnout		32,039		

== Election 2021 ==
General elections were held on 25 July 2021.

General election 2021: LA-35 Jammu and Others-II
Party	Candidate	Votes	%	±%
PTI	Maqbool Ahmed Gujjar	18,934	41.38	
PML(N)	Chaudhry Muhammad Ismail Gujjar	16,855	36.84	
TLP	Muhammad Arif	4,913	10.74	
AJKMC	Sardar Muhammad Gias	3,144	6.87	
Others	Others (nine candidates)	1,910	4.17	
Turnout		45,756	55.43	
Majority		2,079	4.54	
Registered electors		85,247		
PTI gain from PML(N)				

== Election 2026 ==
General elections were held on 2 August 2026. Chaudhry Muhammad Ismail Gujjar won the election with 24,318 votes.

General election 2026: LA-35 Jammu and Others-II
Party	Candidate	Votes	%	±%
PML(N)	Chaudhry Muhammad Ismail Gujjar	24,318	67.35	▲30.51
Independent	Sardar Muhammad Ghias	5,965	16.52	
IPP	Abdul Qadeer	2,757	7.64	
JKUM	Waseem Sadiq	762	2.11	
JI	Sardar Sajid ur Rehman	650	1.80	
PPP	Muhammad Asif	620	1.72	
Others	Others (ten candidates)	1,033	2.86	
Turnout		36,646	41.99	▼13.44
Total valid votes		36,105	98.52	
Rejected ballots		541	1.48	
Majority		18,353	50.83	
Registered electors		87,274		
PML(N) gain from PTI				
