= LA-28 Muzaffarabad-II =

Constituency of the Azad Kashmir Legislative Assembly

- Constituency for the Azad Kashmir Legislative Assembly
- District: Muzaffarabad District
- Electorate: 81,511

Current constituency
- Party: Pakistan People's Party
- Member: Syed Bazil Ali Naqvi
- Created from: LA-25 Muzaffarabad-II

LA-28 Muzaffarabad-II is a constituency of the Azad Kashmir Legislative Assembly which is currently represented by Syed Bazil Ali Naqvi of the Pakistan People's Party (PPP). It covers the area of Pattika in Muzaffarabad District of Azad Kashmir, Pakistan.

== Election 2016 ==
General elections were held in this constituency on 21 July 2016.

General election 2016: LA-25 Muzaffarabad-II
| Party | Candidate | Votes | % | ±% |
|---|---|---|---|---|
| PML(N) | Chaudhary Shahzad Mehmood | 23,432 | | |
| PPP | Syed Bazil Ali Naqvi | 13,171 | | |
| AJKMC | Syed Murtaza Gillani | 8,363 | | |
| Independent | Muhammad Javid | 320 | | |
| MQM-P | Shahid Ahmad | 82 | | |
| Independent | Sajid Khan | 53 | | |
| National Labour Council | Din Muhammad Shah | 50 | | |
| Independent | Shabana Saqi | 48 | | |
| MWM | Syed Mohsin Raza Shah | 40 | | |
| JI | Muhammad Asif Yaqoob | 0 | | |
| Turnout | | 45,523 | | |

== Election 2021 ==
General elections were held on 25 July 2021.

General election 2021: LA-28 Muzaffarabad-II
| Party | Candidate | Votes | % | ±% |
|---|---|---|---|---|
| PPP | Syed Bazil Ali Naqvi | 26,011 | 43.32 | |
| PTI | Chaudhry Shahzad Mehmood | 21,873 | 36.43 | |
| PML(N) | Syed Murtaza Gillani | 7,671 | 12.78 | |
| AJKMC | Muhammad Asif Yaqoob | 2,261 | 3.77 | |
| TLP | Syed Shabeer Hussain Kazmi | 1,248 | 2.08 | |
| Others | Others (thirteen candidates) | 973 | 1.62 | |
| Turnout | | 60,037 | 73.66 | |
| Majority | | 4,138 | 6.89 | |
| Registered electors | | 81,511 | | |
| PPP gain from PML(N) | | | | |

== Election 2026 ==
Elections were held on 2 August 2026. Syed Bazil Ali Naqvi won the election with 27,731 votes.

General election 2026: LA-28 Muzaffarabad-II
| Party | Candidate | Votes | % | ±% |
|---|---|---|---|---|
| PPP | Syed Bazil Ali Naqvi | 27,731 | 47.72 | ▲4.40 |
| PML(N) | Chaudhry Shahzad Mehmood | 26,518 | 45.63 | ▲32.85 |
| AJKMC | Syed Yasir Hussain Naqvi | 858 | 1.48 | ▼2.29 |
| Independent | Nadeem Alam Awan | 596 | 1.03 | |
| Others | Others | 2,410 | 4.15 | |
| Turnout | | 59,228 | 59.25 | ▼14.41 |
| Total valid votes | | 58,113 | 98.12 | |
| Rejected ballots | | 1,115 | 1.88 | |
| Majority | | 1,213 | 2.09 | |
| Registered electors | | 99,971 | | |
