= LA-41 Kashmir Valley-II =

Constituency of the Azad Kashmir Legislative Assembly

- Constituency for the Azad Kashmir Legislative Assembly
- District: Lahore Division
- Electorate: 5,050

Current constituency
- Party: Pakistan Muslim League (N)
- Member: Syed Muhammad Amir Shah
- Created from: LA-37 Kashmir Valley-II

LA-41 Kashmir Valley-II is a constituency of the Azad Kashmir Legislative Assembly which is currently represented by Syed Muhammad Amir Shah of Pakistan Muslim League (N) (PML(N)). It covers the area of Lahore Division. Only refugees from the Kashmir Valley settled in Pakistan are eligible to vote in this constituency.

== Election 2016 ==
General elections were held in this constituency on 21 July 2016.

General election 2016: LA-37 Kashmir Valley-II
Party	Candidate	Votes	%	±%
PTI	Ghulam Mohiuddin Dewan	1,536	60.52	
PML(N)	Ghulam Abbas Mir	909	35.82	
PPP	Syed Umar Sharif Bukhari	85	3.35	
Independent	Saeed Ahmad Dar	5	0.20	
Independent	Zaheer Abbas Mir	2	0.08	
Independent	Saqib Saleem Butt	1	0.04	
Turnout		2,538		

== Election 2021 ==
Ghulam Mohi-ud-Din Dewan of Pakistan Tehreek-e-Insaf won this seat by obtaining 2,326 votes.

General election 2021: LA-41 Kashmir Valley-II
Party	Candidate	Votes	%	±%
PTI	Ghulam Mohi-ud-Din Dewan	2,326	70.61	▲10.09
PML(N)	Muhammad Ikram Butt	741	22.50	▼13.32
PPP	Shabbir Abbas Mir	166	5.04	▲1.72
AJKMC	Syed Maqsood Gillani	10	0.30	▲0.30
Others	Others (four candidates)	51	1.55	
Turnout		3,294	66.23	
Majority		1,585	48.12	
Registered electors		5,050		
PTI hold				

== Election 2026 ==
General elections were held on 2 August 2026. Syed Muhammad Amir Shah won the election with 1,804 votes.

General election 2026: LA-41 Kashmir Valley-II
Party	Candidate	Votes	%	±%
PML(N)	Syed Muhammad Amir Shah	1,804	45.01	▲22.51
Independent	Saba Dewan	1,523	38.00	
IPP	Saeed Ahmed Dar	372	9.28	
PPP	Ghulam Abbas Mir	259	6.46	▲1.42
Others	Others (six candidates)	50	1.25	
Turnout		4,082	63.68	▼2.55
Total valid votes		4,008	98.19	
Rejected ballots		74	1.81	
Majority		281	7.01	
Registered electors		6,410		
PML(N) gain from PTI				
