= LA-14 Bagh-I =

Constituency of the Azad Kashmir Legislative Assembly

- Constituency for the Azad Kashmir Legislative Assembly
- District: Bagh District
- Electorate: 102,491

Current constituency
- Party: Jammu and Kashmir Awami Dast-o-Bazu
- Member: Sajid Iqbal Abbasi
- Created from: LA-13 Bagh-I

LA-14 Bagh-I is a constituency of the Azad Kashmir Legislative Assembly which is currently represented by Sajid Iqbal Abbasi of Jammu and Kashmir Awami Dast-o-Bazu (JKADB). It covers the area of Dhirkot Tehsil in Bagh District.

== Election 2016 ==
General elections were held on 21 July 2016.

General election 2016: LA-13 Bagh-I
Party	Candidate	Votes	%	±%
AJKMC	Attique Ahmed Khan	23,551	42.55	
PML(N)	Raja Ifthikhar Ayub	14,963	27.03	
JI	Muhammad Lateef Khaliq	13,047	23.57	
PPP	Raja Asif Ali Khan	3,386	6.12	
JKPP	Ibrar Ahmed	117	0.21	
Independent	Raja Ghulam Mujtaba Hussain	114	0.21	
Public Rights Party	Nazakat Ilyas	49	0.09	
JUI (F)	Imtiaz Ahmed Abbazi	47	0.08	
Independent	Raja Ifthikhar Ahmed	41	0.07	
Independent	Zafar Iqbal Khan	26	0.05	
Independent	Muhammad Tariq Khan	7	0.01	
Turnout		55,348		

== Election 2021 ==
General elections were held on 25 July 2021.

General election 2021: LA-14 Bagh-I
Party	Candidate	Votes	%	±%
AJKMC	Attique Ahmed Khan	25,389	37.65	▼4.90
PTI	Muhammad Latif Khalique	17,056	25.29	▲25.29
PML(N)	Raja Faisal Azad	8,564	12.70	▼14.33
JI	Khalid Mehmood Khan	6,322	9.37	▼14.20
JUI (F)	Imtiaz Ahmad Abbasi	3,488	5.17	▲5.09
PPP	Muhammad Khawar Khan	2,140	3.17	▼2.95
Independent	Zafar Iqbal Khan	2,124	3.15	▲3.10
TLP	Muhammad Usman Abbasi	1,585	2.35	▲2.35
Others	Others (twelve candidates)	769	1.14	
Turnout		67,437	65.80	
Majority		8,333	12.36	
Registered electors		102,491		
AJKMC hold				

== Election 2026 ==
General elections were held on 10 August 2026. Sajid Iqbal Abbasi won the election with 2,308 votes.

General election 2026: LA-14 Bagh-I
Party	Candidate	Votes	%	±%
JKADB	Sajid Iqbal Abbasi	40,522	60.41	
AJKMC	Attique Ahmed Khan	19,637	29.28	▼8.37
PML(N)	Raja Faisal Azad	3,031	4.52	▼8.18
PPP	Raja Mubashir Ijaz	2,748	4.10	▲0.93
Others	Others (seventeen candidates)	1,136	1.69	
Turnout		68,094	56.18	▼9.62
Total valid votes		67,074	98.50	
Rejected ballots		1,020	1.50	
Majority		20,885	31.14	
Registered electors		121,199		
JKADB gain from AJKMC				
