= LA-6 Bhimber-II =

Electoral district in Azad Jammu and Kashmir

- Constituency for the Azad Kashmir Legislative Assembly
- District: Bhimber District
- Electorate: 92,888

Current constituency
- Party: Pakistan Muslim League (N)
- Member: Chaudhry Muhammad Razzaq

LA-6 Bhimber-II is a constituency of the Azad Kashmir Legislative Assembly which is currently represented by Chaudhry Muhammad Razzaq of Pakistan Muslim League (N). It covers the area of Samahni Tehsil in Bhimber District.

== Election 2016 ==
General elections were held on 21 July 2016.

General election 2016: LA-6 Bhimber-II
Party	Candidate	Votes	%	±%
Independent	Chaudry Ali Shan Soni	23,322		
PML(N)	Raja Maqsood Ahmed Khan	16,285		
PTI	Chaudhry Muhammad Razzaq	9,411		
PPP	Chaudry Waheed Akram	1,036		
Independent	Chaudry Asghar Ali	817		
JI	Muhammad Karim	432		
Independent	Muhammad Latif	93		
Public Rights Party	Raja Soail Younis	79		
Independent	Muhammad Nadeem Khan	42		
Independent	Raja Muhammad Razzaq Khan	31		
Independent	Javid Akhtar	28		
Independent	Ansar Zamman Mughal	23		
Independent	Chaudry Javid Iqbal Gaiyan	15		
Independent	Khushnood Azam Khan	10		
Sunni Ittehad Council	Muhammad Waseem Raza	9		
Independent	Liaqat Aziz	8		
Independent	Razzaq Kashmiri	3		
Turnout		50,541		

== Election 2021 ==
General elections were held on 25 July 2021.

General election 2021: LA-6 Bhimber-II
Party	Candidate	Votes	%	±%
PTI	Chaudry Ali Shan Soni	24,946	39.80	
Independent	Chaudhry Muhammad Razzaq	16,640	26.55	
PML(N)	Raja Maqsood Ahmed Khan	13,394	21.37	
TLP	Ghulam Qadar	3,325	5.30	
AJKMC	Raja Khushnood Azam	2,824	4.51	
Others	Others (ten candidates)	1,552	2.48	
Turnout		62,681	67.48	
Majority		8,306	13.25	
Registered electors		92,888		
PTI gain from Independent				

== Election 2026 ==
General elections were held on 27 July 2026. Chaudhry Muhammad Razzaq of Pakistan Muslim League (N) (PML(N)) won the election with 32,732 votes.

General election 2026: LA-6 Bhimber-II
Party	Candidate	Votes	%	±%
PML(N)	Chaudhry Muhammad Razzaq	32,732	53.80	▲32.43
IPP	Chaudhry Ali Shan Soni	26,718	43.92	
Others	Others (fifteen candidates)	1,389	2.28	
Turnout		61,971	56.87	▼10.61
Total valid votes		60,839	98.17	
Rejected ballots		1,132	1.83	
Majority		6,014	9.88	
Registered electors		108,976		
PML(N) gain from PTI				
