= LA-40 Kashmir Valley-I =

Constituency of the Azad Kashmir Legislative Assembly

- Constituency for the Azad Kashmir Legislative Assembly
- District: Sindh and Balochistan
- Electorate: 5,327

Current constituency
- Party: Pakistan Peoples Party
- Member: Amir Abdul Ghaffar Lone
- Created from: LA-36 Kashmir Valley-I

LA-40 Kashmir Valley-I is a constituency of the Azad Kashmir Legislative Assembly which is currently represented by Amir Abdul Ghaffar Lone of the Pakistan Peoples Party (PPP). It covers the area of Sindh and Balochistan. Only refugees from the Kashmir Valley settled in Pakistan are eligible to vote in this constituency.

== Election 2016 ==
General elections were held in this constituency on 21 July 2016.

General election 2016: LA-36 Kashmir Valley-I
| Party | Candidate | Votes | % | ±% |
|---|---|---|---|---|
| PPP | Amir Abdul Ghaffar Lone | 1,320 | 50.50 | |
| PML(N) | Muhammad Naeem Khan | 507 | 19.40 | |
| Independent | Tahir Ali Dani | 379 | 14.50 | |
| MQM | Abdul Rehman | 175 | 6.69 | |
| PTI | Syed Rizwan | 170 | 6.50 | |
| Independent | Ahmar Ghaffar Loan | 57 | 2.18 | |
| Independent | Abdul Manan Khan | 3 | 0.11 | |
| Independent | Bilal Mashkor Butt | 3 | 0.11 | |
| Independent | Sakeena | 0 | 0.00 | |
| Turnout | | 2,614 | | |

== Election 2021 ==
Aamir Abdul Ghaffar Lone of the Pakistan Peoples Party (PPP) won the seat by getting 2,165 votes.

General election 2021: LA-40 Kashmir Valley-I
| Party | Candidate | Votes | % | ±% |
|---|---|---|---|---|
| PPP | Amir Abdul Ghaffar Lone | 2,165 | 61.73 | ▲11.23 |
| PTI | Muhammad Saleem Butt | 875 | 24.95 | ▲18.26 |
| PML(N) | Tahir Ali Wani | 442 | 12.60 | ▼6.80 |
| PSP | Shabir Ahmed Khan | 16 | 0.46 | ▲0.46 |
| Others | Others (three candidates) | 9 | 0.26 | |
| Turnout | | 3,507 | 65.83 | |
| Majority | | 1,290 | 36.78 | |
| Registered electors | | 5,327 | | |
| PPP hold | | | | |

== Election 2026 ==
General elections were held on 2 August 2026. Amir Abdul Ghaffar Lone won the election with 2,914 votes.

General election 2026 : LA-40 Kashmir Valley-I
| Party | Candidate | Votes | % | ±% |
|---|---|---|---|---|
| PPP | Amir Abdul Ghaffar Lone | 2,914 | 89.61 | ▲27.88 |
| IPP | Muhammad Saleem Butt | 136 | 4.18 | |
| PML(N) | Muhammad Naeem Khan | 102 | 3.14 | ▼9.46 |
| Others | Others | 100 | 3.08 | |
| Turnout | | 3,278 | 56.74 | ▼9.09 |
| Total valid votes | | 3,252 | 99.21 | |
| Rejected ballots | | 26 | 0.79 | |
| Majority | | 2,778 | 85.43 | |
| Registered electors | | 5,777 | | |
| PPP hold | | | | |
