= LA-37 Jammu and Others-IV =

Constituency of the Azad Kashmir Legislative Assembly

- Constituency for the Azad Kashmir Legislative Assembly
- District: Narowal District
- Electorate: 95,694

Current constituency
- Party: Pakistan Muslim League (N)
- Member: Maryam Javed
- Created from: LA-33 Jammu and Others-IV

LA-37 Jammu and Others-IV is a constituency of the Azad Kashmir Legislative Assembly which is currently represented by Maryam Javed the Pakistan Muslim League (N) (PML(N)). It covers the area of Narowal District. Only refugees from Jammu and Ladakh settled in Pakistan are eligible to vote in this constituency.

== Election 2016 ==
General elections were held in this constituency on 21 July 2016.

General election 2016: LA-33 Jammu and Others-IV
Party	Candidate	Votes	%	±%
PML(N)	Mian Muhammad Yasir Rasheed	26,440	54.52	
PTI	Muhammad Akmal Sargala	19,781	40.79	
AJKMC	Muhammad Faiz Chaudhary	1,825	3.76	
PPP	Syed Ishtiaq ul Hassan Gillani	234	0.48	
Independent	Bashir Ahmad Qadri	151	0.31	
Independent	Muhammad Zahid	63	0.13	
Turnout		48,494		

== Election 2021 ==
Muhammad Akmal Sargala of the Pakistan Tehreek-e-Insaf (PTI) won the seat by obtaining 26,039 votes.

General election 2021: LA-37 Jammu & Others-IV
Party	Candidate	Votes	%	±%
PTI	Muhammad Akmal Sargala	26,039	42.11	▲1.32
PML(N)	Muhammad Siddique Chaudhry	25,726	41.61	▼12.91
TLP	Arslan Rasheed	4,378	7.08	▲7.08
AJKMC	Muhammad Rabiah	2,247	3.63	▼0.13
Others	Others (seven candidates)	3,443	5.57	
Turnout		61,833	64.62	
Majority		313	0.51	
Registered electors		95,694		
PTI gain from PML(N)				

== Election 2026 ==
General elections were held on 2 August 2026. Maryam Javed won the election with 28,547 votes.

General election 2026: LA-37 Jammu & Others-IV
Party	Candidate	Votes	%	±%
PML(N)	Maryam Javed	28,547	51.27	▲9.66
JKUM	Usman Aleem	22,937	41.19	
JI	Muhammad Iqbal	2,181	3.92	
Others	Others	2,017	3.62	
Turnout		56,408	50.73	▼13.89
Total valid votes		55,682	98.71	
Rejected ballots		726	1.29	
Majority		5,610	10.08	
Registered electors		111,203		
PML(N) gain from PTI				
