= LA-39 Jammu and Others-VI =

Constituency in Pakistan

- Constituency for the Azad Kashmir Legislative Assembly
- District: Rawalpindi Division, Islamabad Capital Territory, and Khyber Pakhtunkhwa
- Electorate: 36,455

Current constituency
- Party: Pakistan Muslim League (N)
- Member: Raja Muhammad Siddique Khan
- Created from: LA-35 Jammu and Others-VI

LA-39 Jammu and Others-VI is a constituency of the Azad Kashmir Legislative Assembly which is currently represented by Raja Muhammad Siddique Khan of the Pakistan Muslim League (N) (PML(N)). It covers the area of Rawalpindi Division, Islamabad Capital Territory, and Khyber Pakhtunkhwa. Only refugees from Jammu and Ladakh settled in Pakistan are eligible to vote in this constituency.

== Election 2016 ==
General elections were held in this constituency on 21 July 2016.

General election 2016: LA-35 Jammu & Others-VI
Party	Candidate	Votes	%	±%
PML(N)	Raja Muhammad Siddique Khan	11,058	43.21	
PPP	Chaudhary Fakhar Zaman	5,662	22.12	
PTI	Hameed Khan	4,485	17.53	
Independent	Muhammad Shahzad Khan	1,380	5.39	
Independent	Muhammad Razzaq	1,184	4.63	
AJKMC	Yousif Naseem	1,052	4.11	
Independent	Muhammad Sagheer	299	1.17	
Independent	Gulnar Iqbal	215	0.84	
JKPP	Javid Aftar	118	0.46	
MQM	Ayaz Ahmad	89	0.35	
Independent	Syed Nasir Hussain Bukhari	23	0.09	
Independent	Raja Suleman Siddique	16	0.06	
Independent	Muhammad Mumtaz Abbasi	11	0.04	
Turnout		25,592		

== Election 2021 ==
Raja Muhammad Siddique of the Pakistan Muslim League (N) (PML(N)) won this seat by getting 9,557 votes.

General election 2021: LA-39 Jammu & Others-VI
Party	Candidate	Votes	%	±%
PML(N)	Raja Muhammad Siddique Khan	9,557	42.69	▼0.52
PTI	Nazia Niaz	7,510	33.54	▲16.01
PPP	Chaudhry Fakhar Zaman	2,697	12.05	▼10.07
TLP	Rashid Mehmood	1,631	7.28	▲7.28
AJKMC	Nazar Abbas Shah	441	1.97	▼2.14
Others	Others (eight candidates)	553	2.42	
Turnout		22,389	61.42	
Majority		2,047	9.14	
Registered electors		36,455		
PML(N) hold				

== Election 2026 ==
General elections were held on 2 August 2026. Raja Muhammad Siddique Khan won the election with 13,652 votes.

General election 2026: LA-39 Jammu & Others-VI
Party	Candidate	Votes	%	±%
PML(N)	Raja Muhammad Siddique Khan	10,981	58.93	▲16.24
PPP	Chaudhry Fakhar Zaman	5,081	27.27	▲15.22
Independent	Khawaja Muhammad Usman Naeem	1,001	5.37	
AJKMC	Abdul Khateeb	460	2.47	▲0.50
JI	Mirza Tajamul Hussain Jaral	325	1.74	
Others	Others (nine candidates)	786	4.22	
Turnout		19,052	50.62	▼10.80
Total valid votes		18,634	97.81	
Rejected ballots		418	2.19	
Majority		5,900	31.66	
Registered electors		37,639		
PML(N) hold				
