= LA-24 Poonch & Sudhnoti-VII =

Constituency of the Azad Kashmir Legislative Assembly

- Constituency for the Azad Kashmir Legislative Assembly
- District: Sudhanoti District
- Electorate: 98,359

Current constituency
- Party: Pakistan Tehreek-e-Insaf
- Member: Sardar Faheem Akhtar Rabbani

LA-24 Poonch & Sudhnoti-VII is a constituency of the Azad Kashmir Legislative Assembly which is currently represented by Sardar Faheem Akhtar Rqabbani of the Pakistan Tehreek-e-Insaf (PTI). It covers the areas of Balouch Tehsil and Tarar Khel Tehsil in Sudhanoti District.

== Election 2016 ==
General elections were held in this constituency on 21 July 2016.

General election 2016: LA-22 Poonch & Sudhnoti-VI
Party	Candidate	Votes	%	±%
PML(N)	Sardar Farooq Ahmed Tahir	26,270		
PPP	Sardar Faheem Akhtar	19,406		
AJKMC	Sajjad Hussain Sajid	3,224		
PTI	Raja Ibrar ul Haq Minhas	1,742		
Sunni Ittehad Council	Muhammad Abbas	335		
Independent	Jabir Karim	254		
Independent	Mumtaz Afzal	138		
Independent	Abid Hussain	64		
Independent	Farooq Arshad Khan	46		
Turnout		51,479		

== Election 2021 ==
General elections were held on 25 July 2021.

General election 2021: LA-24 Poonch & Sudhnoti-VII
Party	Candidate	Votes	%	±%
PTI	Sardar Faheem Akhtar	30,787	47.26	
PML(N)	Sardar Farooq Ahmed Tahir	24,363	37.40	
TLP	Zulfiqar Ali	4,472	6.86	
PPP	Innyat Ullah	1,710	2.62	
AJKMC	Abrar ul Haq Minhas	1,660	2.55	
Others	Others (fifteen candidates)	2,155	3.31	
Turnout		65,147	66.11	
Majority		6,404	9.83	
Registered electors		98,539		
PTI gain from PML(N)				
