= LA-38 Jammu and Others-V =

Constituency of the Azad Kashmir Legislative Assembly

- Constituency for the Azad Kashmir Legislative Assembly
- District: Gujrat District, Wazirabad District, and Mandi Bahauddin District
- Electorate: 48,504

Current constituency
- Party: Pakistan Muslim League (N)
- Member: Choudhary Zeeshan Younas Tanda
- Created from: LA-34 Jammu and Others-V

LA-38 Jammu and Others-V is a constituency of the Azad Kashmir Legislative Assembly which is currently represented by Choudhary Zeeshan Younas Tanda of the Pakistan Muslim League (N) (PML(N)). It covers the area of Gujrat District, Wazirabad District, and Mandi Bahauddin District. Only refugees from Jammu and Ladakh settled in Pakistan are eligible to vote in this constituency.

== Election 2016 ==
General elections were held in this constituency on 21 July 2016.

General election 2016: LA-34 Jammu and Others-V
Party	Candidate	Votes	%	±%
PML(N)	Chaudry Javid Akhtar	12,938	39.90	
Independent	Chaudhary Mohammad Akbar Ibrahim	10,966	33.82	
PTI	Muhammad Afzal	6,983	21.53	
PPP	Amjad Ali	1,077	3.32	
AJKMC	Muhammad Akram	251	0.77	
Independent	Abdul Qadoos	174	0.54	
Independent	Muhammad Shafiq Mirza	24	0.07	
Independent	Muhammad Nawaz	16	0.05	
Turnout		32,429		

== Election 2021 ==
Muhammad Akbar Chaudhry of the Pakistan Tehreek-e-Insaf (PTI) won the seat by getting 14,283 votes.

General election 2021: LA-38 Jammu & Others-V
Party	Candidate	Votes	%	±%
PTI	Chaudhary Mohammad Akbar Ibrahim	14,283	40.18	▲18.65
PML(N)	Choudhary Zeeshan Younas Tanda	8,755	30.76	▼9.14
TLP	Zafar Iqbal Chaudhry	2,811	9.88	▲9.88
JI	Muhammad Umer Siddique	1,737	6.10	▼6.10
AJKMC	Raja Shahid Iqbal	382	1.34	▲0.57
Independent	Hassan Mehmood	247	0.87	
PPP	Mohammad Ashraf Chughtai	192	0.67	▼2.65
Independent	Muhammad Iqbal	54	0.19	
Turnout		28,461	58.68	
Majority		5,528	19.42	
Registered electors		48,504		
PTI gain from PML(N)				

== Election 2026 ==
General elections were held on 2 August 2026. Choudhary Zeeshan Younas Tanda won the election with 13,652 votes.

General election 2026: LA-38 Jammu & Others-V
Party	Candidate	Votes	%	±%
PML(N)	Choudhary Zeeshan Younas Tanda	13,652	52.11	▲21.35
PML(Q)	Chaudhary Mohammad Akbar Ibrahim	9,523	36.35	
JI	Muhammad Umar Siddique	1,755	6.70	▲0.60
Others	Others	1,269	4.84	
Turnout		26,647	53.06	▼5.62
Total valid votes		26,199	98.32	
Rejected ballots		448	1.68	
Majority		4,129	15.76	
Registered electors		50,225		
PML(N) gain from PTI				
