= LA-36 Jammu and Others-III =

Electoral district in Azad Jammu and Kashmir

- Constituency for the Azad Kashmir Legislative Assembly
- District: Sialkot Tehsil of Sialkot District
- Electorate: 93,804

Current constituency
- Party: Pakistan Muslim League (N)
- Member: Muhammad Ahsan Raza
- Created from: LA-32 Jammu and Others-III

LA-36 Jammu and Others-III is a constituency of the Azad Kashmir Legislative Assembly which is currently represented by Muhammad Ahsan Raza of Pakistan Muslim League (N) (PML(N)). It covers the area of Sialkot Tehsil in Sialkot District. Only refuges from Jammu and Ladakh settled in Pakistan are eligible to vote in this constituency.

== Election 2016 ==
General elections were held in this constituency on 21 July 2016.

General election 2016: LA-32 Jammu and Others-III
Party	Candidate	Votes	%	±%
PML(N)	Muhammad Ishaq	18,597		
PTI	Hafiz Hamid Raza	14,776		
PPP	Chaudhary Shaukat Ali	6,460		
Independent	Muhammad Afzal Humayun	29		
Independent	Naseer Ahmad	20		
Independent	Chaudhary Muhammad Sohail	19		
Turnout		39,897		

== Election 2021 ==
General elections were held on 25 July 2021.

General election 2021: LA-36 Jammu and Others-III
Party	Candidate	Votes	%	±%
PTI	Hafiz Hamid Raza	22,096	41.30	
PML(N)	Muhammad Ishaq	20,467	38.26	
TLP	Rana Adnan Jamil	7,049	13.18	
PPP	Chaudhry Shaukat Ali	2,609	4.88	
Others	Others (eight candidates)	1,279	2.39	
Turnout		53,500	57.03	
Majority		1,629	3.04	
Registered electors		93,804		
PTI gain from PML(N)				

== Election 2026 ==
General elections were held on 2 August 2026. Muhammad Ahsan Raza won the election with 27,218 votes.

General election 2026: LA-36 Jammu and Others-III
Party	Candidate	Votes	%	±%
PML(N)	Muhammad Ahsan Raza	27,218	64.32	▲26.06
PPP	Ahsan Ismail	12,990	30.70	▲25.82
Others	Others (eleven candidates)	2,106	4.98	
Turnout		43,081	43.05	▼13.98
Total valid votes		42,314	98.22	
Rejected ballots		767	1.78	
Majority		14,228	33.62	
Registered electors		100,073		
PML(N) gain from PTI				
