= LA-42 Kashmir Valley-III =

Constituency of the Azad Kashmir Legislative Assembly

- Constituency for the Azad Kashmir Legislative Assembly
- District: Punjab (excluding Lahore Division, Attock District, and Rawalpindi District)
- Electorate: 4,461

Current constituency
- Party: Pakistan Muslim League (N)
- Member: Syed Shaukat Ali Shah
- Created from: LA-38 Kashmir Valley-III

LA-42 Kashmir Valley-III is a constituency of the Azad Kashmir Legislative Assembly which is currently represented by Syed Shaukat Ali Shah of Pakistan Muslim League (N) (PML(N)). It covers the area of Punjab (excluding Lahore Division, Attock District, and Rawalpindi District). Only refugees from the Kashmir Valley settled in Pakistan are eligible to vote in this constituency.

== Election 2016 ==
General elections were held in this constituency on 21 July 2016.

General election 2016: LA-38 Kashmir Valley-III
Party	Candidate	Votes	%	±%
PML(N)	Syed Shaukat Ali Shah	1,082	44.77	
PTI	Muhammad Shah	657	27.18	
Independent	Muhammad Asim Shareef	443	18.33	
PPP	Hafeez Ahmad Butt	235	9.72	
Turnout		2,417		

== Election 2021 ==
Muhammad Asim Sharif of the Pakistan Tehreek-e-Insaf (PTI) won this seat by getting 1,254 votes.

General election 2021: LA-42 Kashmir Valley-III
Party	Candidate	Votes	%	±%
PTI	Muhammad Asim Sharif	1,254	43.86	▲16.68
PML(N)	Syed Shaukat Ali Shah	1,205	42.15	▼2.62
JI	Saeed Ahmed Khan	159	5.56	▲5.56
PPP	Hafeez Ahmed Butt	155	5.42	▼4.30
AJKMC	Rana Sarfraz Ahmed	40	1.40	▲1.40
Others	Others (four candidates)	46	1.61	
Turnout		2,859	64.09	
Majority		49	1.71	
Registered electors		4,461		
PTI gain from PML(N)				

== Election 2026 ==
General elections were held on 2 August 2026. Syed Shaukat Ali Shah won the election with 1,524 votes.

General election 2026: LA-42 Kashmir Valley-III
Party	Candidate	Votes	%	±%
PML(N)	Syed Shaukat Ali Shah	1,524	63.32	▲21.17
PPP	Muhammad Asim Sharif	477	19.82	▲14.40
JI	Saeed Ahmed Khan	203	8.43	▲2.87
Independent	Syed Hassan Mahmood	147	6.11	
Others	Others (three candidates)	56	2.33	
Turnout		2,451	58.82	▼5.27
Total valid votes		2,407	98.20	
Rejected ballots		44	1.80	
Majority		1,047	43.50	
Registered electors		4,167		
PML(N) gain from PTI				
