= LA-44 Kashmir Valley-V =

Constituency of the Azad Kashmir Legislative Assembly

- Constituency for the Azad Kashmir Legislative Assembly
- District: Attock District, Rawalpindi District (excluding Rawalpindi city), and Islamabad Capital Territory
- Electorate: 6,340

Current constituency
- Party: Pakistan Muslim League (N)
- Member: Muhammad Ahmed Raza Qadri
- Created from: LA-40 Kashmir Valley-V

LA-44 Kashmir Valley-V is a constituency of the Azad Kashmir Legislative Assembly which is currently represented by Muhammad Ahmed Raza Qadri of the Pakistan Muslim League (N) (PML(N)). It covers the area of Attock District, Rawalpindi District (excluding Rawalpindi city), and the Islamabad Capital Territory. Only refugees from the Kashmir Valley settled in Pakistan are eligible to vote in this constituency.

== Election 2016 ==
General elections were held in this constituency on 21 July 2016.

General election 2016: LA-40 Kashmir Valley-V
| Party | Candidate | Votes | % | ±% |
|---|---|---|---|---|
| PML(N) | Muhammad Ahmed Raza Qadri | 2,085 | 46.86 | |
| AJKMC | Mehar un Nisa | 1,053 | 23.67 | |
| PPP | Abdul Salam Butt | 858 | 19.29 | |
| Independent | Shabbir Ahmad Tantray | 410 | 9.22 | |
| Independent | Chaudhary Muhammad Nazir | 39 | 0.88 | |
| Independent | Zafar Iqbal Qureishi | 2 | 0.04 | |
| Independent | Nasir Islam Butt | 2 | 0.04 | |
| Independent | Abdul Aziz | 0 | 0.00 | |
| Turnout | | 4,449 | | |

== Election 2021 ==
Muhammad Ahmad Raza Qadri of the Pakistan Muslim League (N) (PML(N)) won this seat by obtaining 2,027 votes.

General election 2021: LA-44 Kashmir Valley-V
| Party | Candidate | Votes | % | ±% |
|---|---|---|---|---|
| PML(N) | Muhammad Ahmed Raza Qadri | 2,027 | 44.72 | ▼2.14 |
| AJKMC | Mehr un Nisa | 1,195 | 26.36 | ▲2.69 |
| PTI | Bashir Ahmed Khan | 601 | 13.26 | ▲13.26 |
| PPP | Muhammad Rashid Islam | 550 | 12.13 | ▼7.16 |
| TLP | Naseer Ullah Khan Durrani | 101 | 2.23 | ▲2.23 |
| Others | Others (eight candidates) | 59 | 1.30 | |
| Turnout | | 4,533 | 71.50 | |
| Majority | | 832 | 18.35 | |
| Registered electors | | 6,340 | | |
| PML(N) hold | | | | |

== Election 2026 ==
General elections were held on 2 August 2026. Muhammad Ahmed Raza Qadri won the election with 2,308 votes.

General election 2026: LA-44 Kashmir Valley-V
| Party | Candidate | Votes | % | ±% |
|---|---|---|---|---|
| PML(N) | Muhammad Ahmed Raza Qadri | 2,308 | 57.47 | ▲12.75 |
| AJKMC | Mehr-un-Nisa | 740 | 18.43 | ▼7.93 |
| PPP | Muhammad Rashid Islam | 502 | 12.50 | ▲0.37 |
| JI | Hanif Manzoor Dar | 392 | 9.76 | |
| Others | Others (four candidates) | 74 | 1.84 | |
| Turnout | | 4,064 | 58.46 | ▼13.04 |
| Total valid votes | | 4,016 | 98.82 | |
| Rejected ballots | | 48 | 1.18 | |
| Majority | | 1,568 | 39.04 | |
| Registered electors | | 6,952 | | |
| PML(N) hold | | | | |
