= Sehnsa Tehsil =

Tehsil in Azad Kashmir, Pakistan

Sehnsa سہنسہ
- Tehsil
- Location within Azad Kashmir Location within Pakistan
- Coordinates: 33.513650°N 73.7556233°E
- Administering country: Pakistan
- Territory: Azad Kashmir
- District: Kotli District

Area
  - Total: 399 km^{2} (154 sq mi)

Population (2017)
  - Total: 62,213
  - Density: 156/km^{2} (404/sq mi)
- Time zone: UTC+5 (PKT)

Sehnsa (Urdu: سہنسہ) is a tehsil (subdistrict) of Kotli District in Azad Kashmir, a part of Kashmir administered by Pakistan. As of the 2017 Pakistani census, the population of Sehnsa was 97,216.

== Geography ==
Sehnsa covers an area of 399 square kilometres and has jurisdiction over 71 villages within its borders.

== Demographics ==
The 2017 Pakistani census recorded 97,216 people living in 14,628 households in Sehnsa. All residents are Sunni Muslim.
