= Kotli =

Kotli کوٹلی
- City
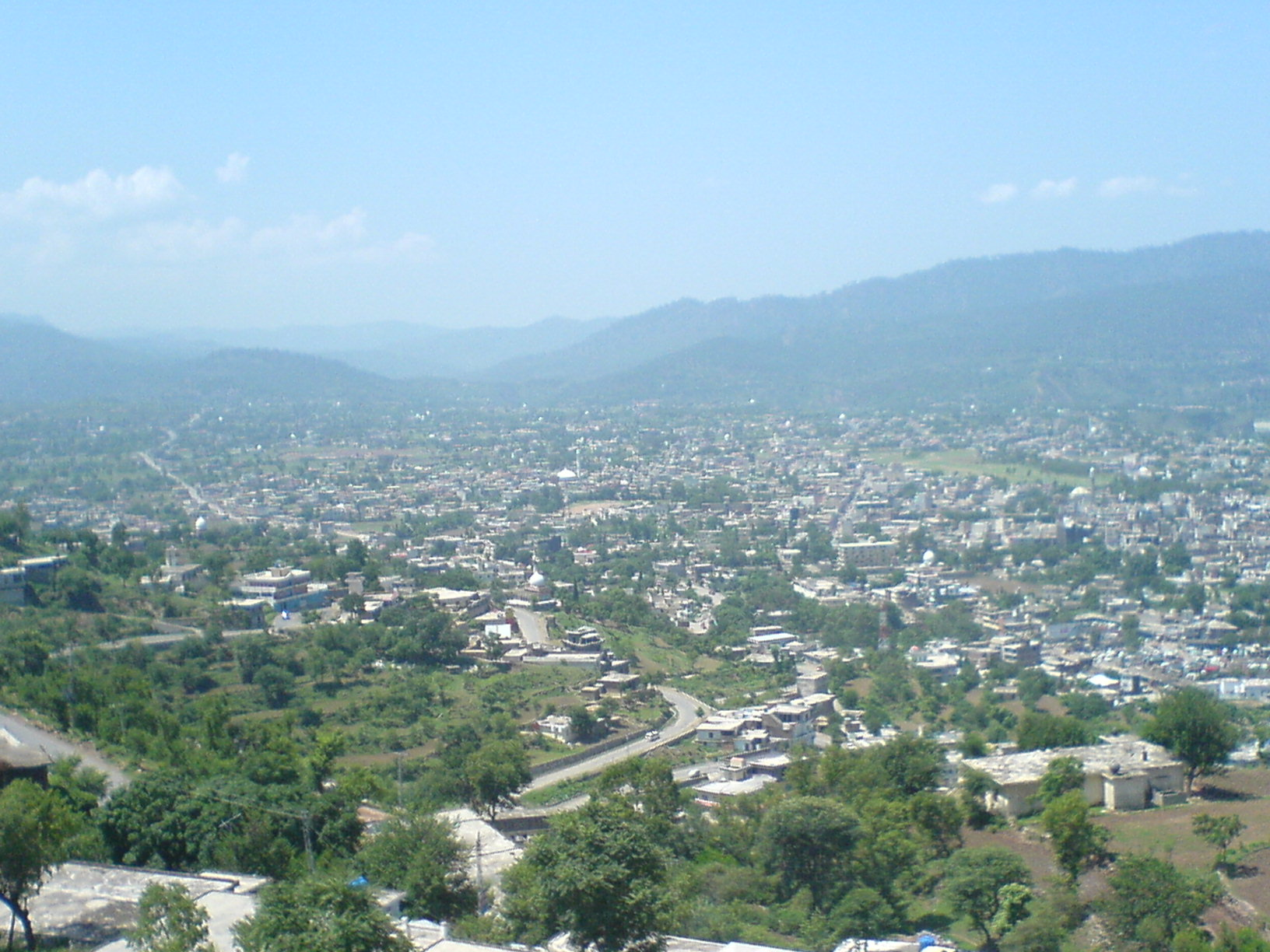

- Location within Azad Kashmir
- Administering country: Pakistan
- Territory: Azad Kashmir
- Division: Mirpur
- Constructed: Mid 15th Century
- Union Councils: 18

Government
  - Type: Health Minister
  - Member of Legislative Assembly: Dr Nisar Ansar Abdali (Ex, PTI Joint Government)

Population (2017 Census)
  - Total: 46,907

Languages
  - Official: Urdu
  - Spoken: Pahari-Pothwari; Gojri
- Time zone: UTC+5 (PST)
- Postal Code: 11100
- Area code: 0092-58264
- Website: District Website

Kotli (Pahari-Pothwari / Urdu: کوٹلی; pronounced [koːʈ.liː]) is a city and headquarters of the Kotli District in Pakistan-administered Azad Kashmir. The city lies along the Poonch River, which is known for its natural scenery and waterfalls. According to the 2017 Census of Pakistan, the city has a population of 46,907 people.

== History ==
The city of Kotli dates back to the twelfth century, when it was settled by a branch of the Royal Mangral Rajput family of Kashmir, descendants of Raja Mangar Pal. Originally known as Kohtali, literally meaning "under the mountain" due to the surrounding mountainous landscape. Kotli remained as a semi-autonomous state until it was finally subdued by Ranjit Singh in 1819 and incorporated into the Sikh Empire.

After the Independence of Pakistan and India from the British rule, fighting broke out in the princely state of Jammu and Kashmir. In November 1947, armed groups of deserters from the State Forces, some Pakistan Army personnel on leave, ex-servicemen and other volunteers reached Kotli and after a night of fighting, forced the Dogra garrison to withdraw from the town. Indian forces were deployed to Jammu and Kashmir following the accession of the state to India and engaged with opposing forces in the vicinity of Kotli. Pakistani forces and their allies retained control of Kotli which has remained part of Pakistan-administered Kashmir since the conflict.

== Education ==
Kotil is home to the University of Kotli (Urdu: کوٹلی یونیورسٹی) (UoK), formerly a constituent college of the University of Azad Jammu and Kashmir. It became a university as a result of Presidential Ordinance VIII passed in 2014.

== Tourism ==
Two known waterfalls in the area are the Lala Waterfall, close to Kotli town and the Gulpur Waterfalls, found in the village of Gulpur to the southwest.

Sarda Point View is place to enjoy the view of Kotli City.
