= Kotli District =

District in Azad Kashmir, Pakistan

Kotli District ضلع کوٹلی
- District of Azad Kashmir administered by Pakistan
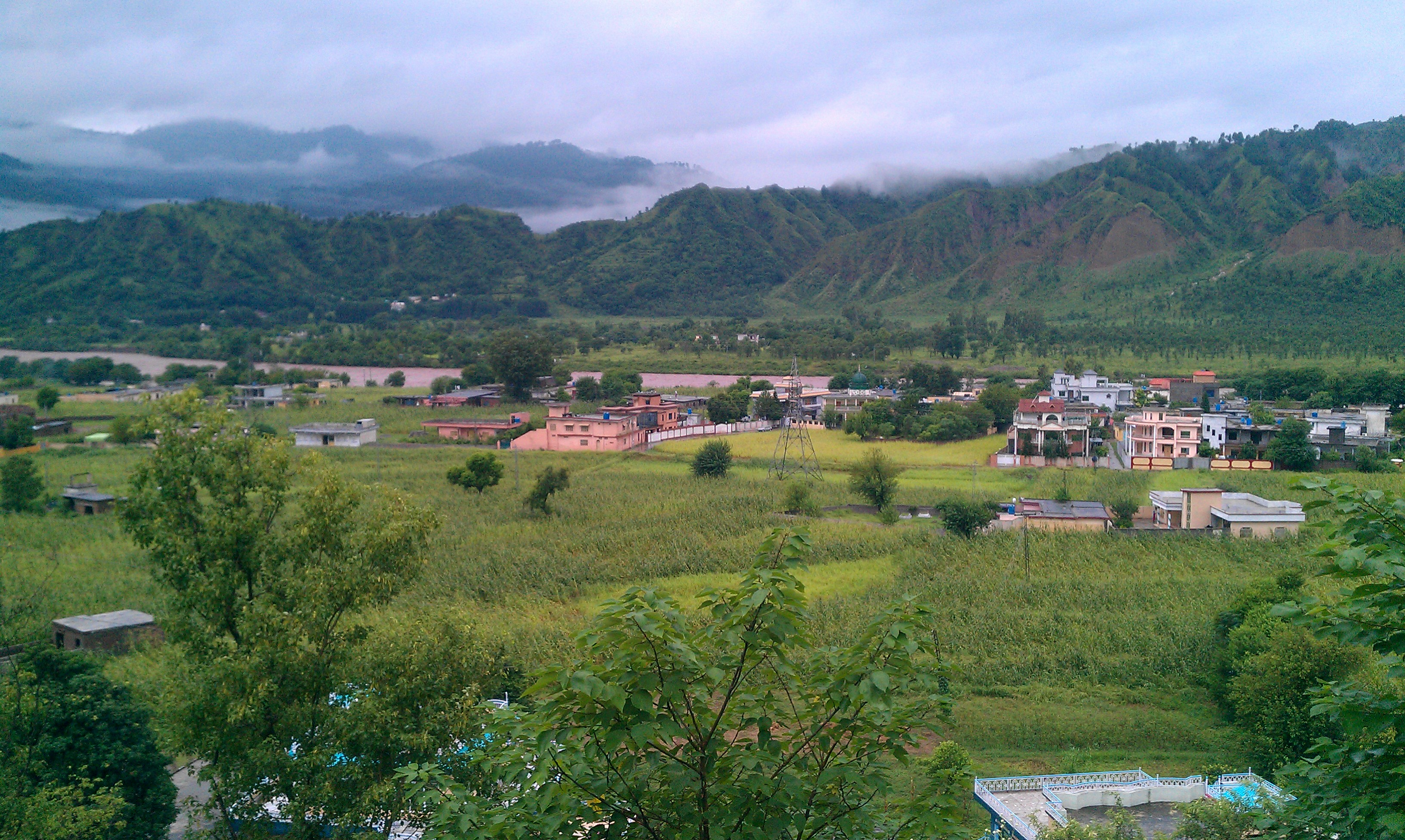

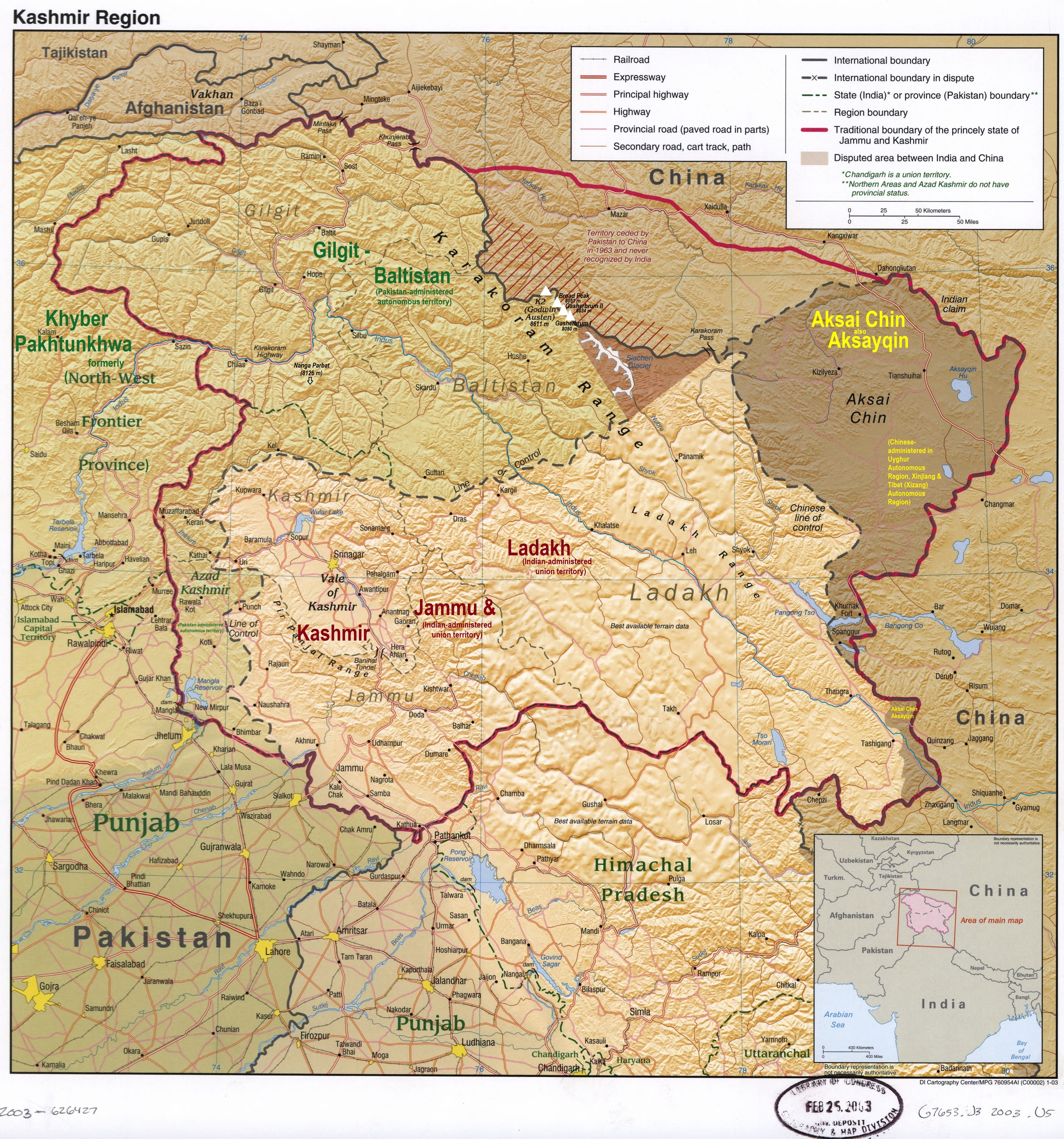
- A map showing Pakistani-administered Azad Kashmir (shaded in sage green) in the disputed Kashmir region
- Interactive map of Kotli District
- Coordinates (Kotli): 33°30′20″N 73°53′57″E
- Administrating country: Pakistan
- Territory: Azad Kashmir
- Division: Mirpur Division
- Headquarters: Kotli

Government
  - Type: District Administration
  - Deputy Commissioner: N/A
  - District Police Officer: N/A
  - District Health Officer: Syed Shafqat Hussain Shah

Area
  - Total: 1,862 km^{2} (719 sq mi)

Population (2017)
  - Total: 774,194
  - Density: 415.8/km^{2} (1,077/sq mi)

Languages
  - Official: Urdu
  - Spoken: Pahari; Gujari
- Number of Tehsils: 4

Kotli District (Urdu: ضلع کوٹلی) is a district of Pakistan-administered Azad Kashmir in the disputed Kashmir region. It is one of the 10 districts of Pakistan's dependent territory of Azad Kashmir. It is bounded on the north by the Sudhanoti District and the Poonch District, on the north-east by the Poonch District of Indian-administered Jammu and Kashmir, on the south by the Mirpur and Bhimber districts, and on the west by the Rawalpindi District on Pakistan's Punjab Province. Kotli is the largest district of Azad Kashmir by population and the second biggest by land area, after the Neelum District. The district headquarters is the city of Kotli.

Map of Azad Kashmir with the Kotli District highlighted in red

== Demographics ==
The total population of the district, according to the 2017 census, is 774,194.

=== Social groups ===
Gujjar is a major ethnic group of Kotli district and they make up to 35% of total population of the district and they mainly speak Gujari as their mother tongue.

=== Language ===
Two major languages spoken in the district are Pahari and Gujari. In Kotli District Pahari is spoken by 50% Pahari-Pothwari (including all dialects), 35% Gujari, and 15% speak other languages. The dialect of Gujari spoken in Kotli district is known as Southern Azad Kashmir Gujari.

1. Pahari (50.0%)
2. Gujari (Gojri) (35.0%)
3. Other (15.0%)

== Administrative divisions ==
The Kotli District was previously a subdivision of the Mirpur District until 1975. Before 1947, it was part of the Jammu area of Jammu and Kashmir. The district is divided into six tehsils:

- Kotli Tehsil
- Charhoi Tehsil
- Sehnsa Tehsil
- Khuiratta Tehsil

== Education ==
According to the Pakistan District Education Ranking 2017, a report by Alif Ailaan, the Kotli District stands at number 7 nationally relating to education, with a score of 73.68. The learning score stands at 85.67 and gender parity is at 93.45.

According to the same report, the Kotli District is ranked at 119 nationally, with a learning score of 35.47 and a retention score of 35.36. The learning score is low because of a lack of quality teachers and proper teacher training. The retention score is low because of the low number of beyond-primary schools.

With regard to infrastructure, the Kotli District stands at 154, with a score of 14.14, which is the second lowest in Pakistan and its two dependent territories. That score shows that there is a serious problem with the lack of basic facilities such as electricity, functional toilets, furniture, and boundary walls.

== See also ==
- Dahana
- Ethnic Groups of Azad Kashmir
