= List of protests in Pakistan =

The history of protests in Pakistan dates back to its establishment as an independent nation for India's Muslim population in 1947. Since then, Pakistan has seen a multitude of protests and uprisings, serving as a reflection of the various political, social, and economic challenges it has encountered throughout its history. These protests have been a prominent part of Pakistan's socio-political landscape.

== 1947-1950s ==
- 1947: Kashmir Day protests against the Indian controlled Kashmir.
- 1951: Rawalpindi conspiracy protests against the arrest of military officers by the government.
- 1953: Lahore riots protests against the Ahmadiyya Muslim community.

== 1960s ==
- 1968: 1968–69 Pakistan revolution against Ayub Khan regime protests against the dictatorship of President Ayub Khan.

== 1970s ==
- 1971: Bangladesh independence protests against the Pakistani Army during the Bangladesh Liberation War.
- 1972: Karachi labour unrest of 1972, Labour movement protests against the government's labour policies.
- 1977: 1977 Pakistan uprising, movement against Zulfikar Ali Bhutto protests against the dictatorship of Prime Minister Zulfikar Ali Bhutto.

== 1980s ==
- 1984: Movement for the Restoration of Democracy, Movement against Zia-ul-Haq regime protests against the dictatorship of President Zia-ul-Haq.
- 1986: Movement against the Hudood Ordinance protests against the government's implementation of Islamic laws.

== 1990s ==
- 1990: Movement for the Restoration of Democracy protests against the government's rigging of elections.
- 1992: Protests against the demolition of the Babri Masjid in India.
- 1997: Lawyers' movement protests against the government's attempts to remove the Chief Justice of Pakistan.

== 2000s ==
- 2001: War in Afghanistan protests against the US-led invasion of Afghanistan.
- 2007: Lawyers' Movement protests against the suspension of Chief Justice of Pakistan Iftikhar Muhammad Chaudhry.
- 2008: Long March protests against the government's attempts to remove the Chief Justice of Pakistan.

== 2010s ==
- 2011: Raymond Allen Davis incident protests against the release of Raymond Davis, a US contractor who killed two Pakistani citizens.
- 2013: Islamabad sit-in protests against the government's electoral rigging.
- Long March (Pakistan)
- 2014: Inqilab March
- November–December 2017: 2017 Fayzabad protests
- Sadae Mazlomeen Dharna (Parachinar)
- 2018: Pashtun Tahaffuz Movement protests against the Pakistani state's extrajudicial killing and enforced disappearance of Pashtuns.

== 2020s ==
- 2020: Aurat March protests against gender-based violence and discriminations
- 2021 Pakistani protests
- October 2021 Tehreek-e-Labbaik Pakistan protests
- Gwadar protest
- 2022 Azadi March II
- PPP long march
- 2022 Karachi protests
- Huqooq-e-Sindh March
- Jail Bharo Tehreek
- 2023 Pakistani protests
- 2023–2024 Gilgit-Baltistan Protests
- 2024 Azad Kashmir protests
- 2024 Pakistani protests
- 2025 Azad Kashmir protests
- 2025 Tehreek-e-Labbaik Pakistan protests
- 2026 Azad Kashmir protests
