= Hill Surang =

Town and Union Council in Bagh District, Azad Kashmir, Pakistan

Hill Surang ہل سرنگ
- Town and Union Council
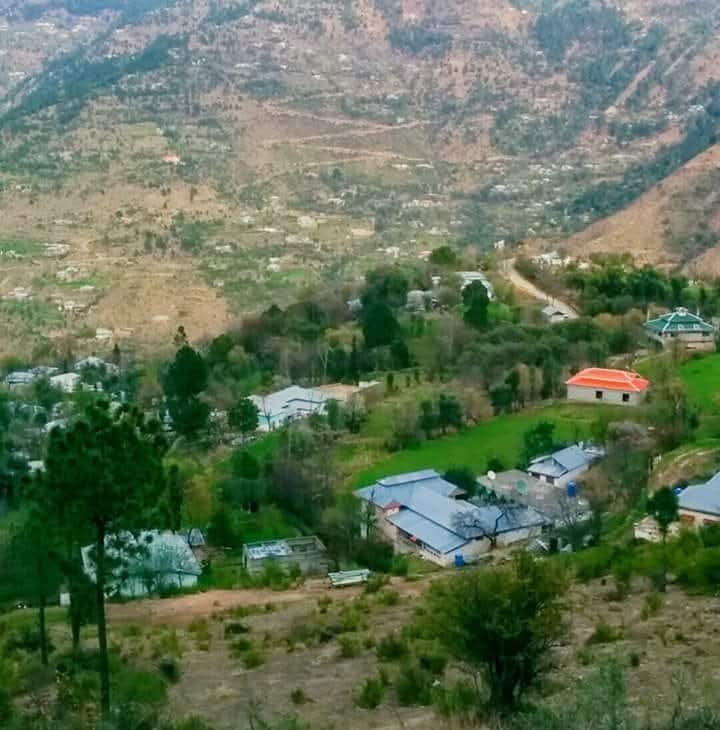

- Location in Azad Kashmir, Pakistan Hill Surang (Kashmir) Hill Surang (Pakistan)
- Coordinates: 34.0901564°N 73.5282540°E
- Country: Pakistan
- Territory: Azad Jammu and Kashmir
- District: Bagh
- Tehsil: Dhirkot
- Post Office: Chamankot
- Postal Code: 12630

Area
  - Total: 7.23 km^{2} (2.79 sq mi)

Population (2017)
  - Total: 4,000
- approximate figure for the core town area; the wider Union Council is estimated at 20,000
- Time zone: UTC+5 (PST)

Hill Surang (Urdu: ہل سرنگ) is a town and Union Council in the Dhirkot Tehsil of Bagh District, Azad Jammu and Kashmir, Pakistan.

It is a mountainous rural village, located on the Kohala–Bagh road, and it borders Munasa, Chamankot, and Kohala. The village is connected to the regional road network via the Kohala–Bagh Road and Dhirkot Road. The town has a population of around 4,000 to 4,500, while the total population of Union Council is estimated at 20,000.

Hill Surang is one of several Union Councils within Bagh District, which recorded a total population of 371,919 in the 2017 Census.

It is managed under the Dhirkot Tehsil, including Hill Village, Mohallah Hill Bandi, and Mohallah Bangal Bangala.

== Institutions ==
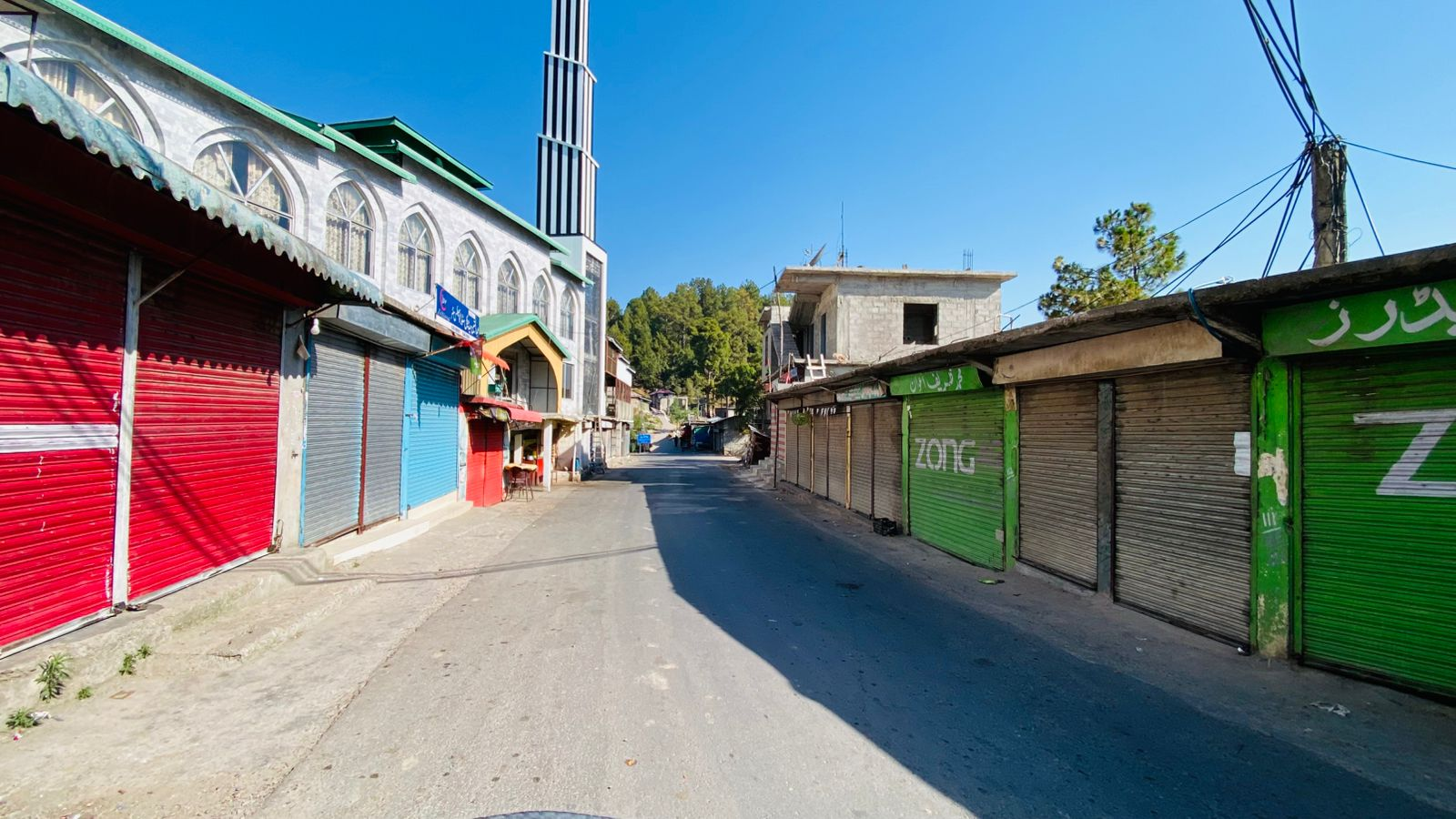
A view of Jamia Masjid Farooq Azam in Hill Bazar, Hill Surang Village

Religious institutions include Madrasa Tajveed-ul-Quran Hill and Jamia Masjid Farooq-e-Azam Hill, both in the main Hill Bazar area, alongside a number of smaller local mosques.

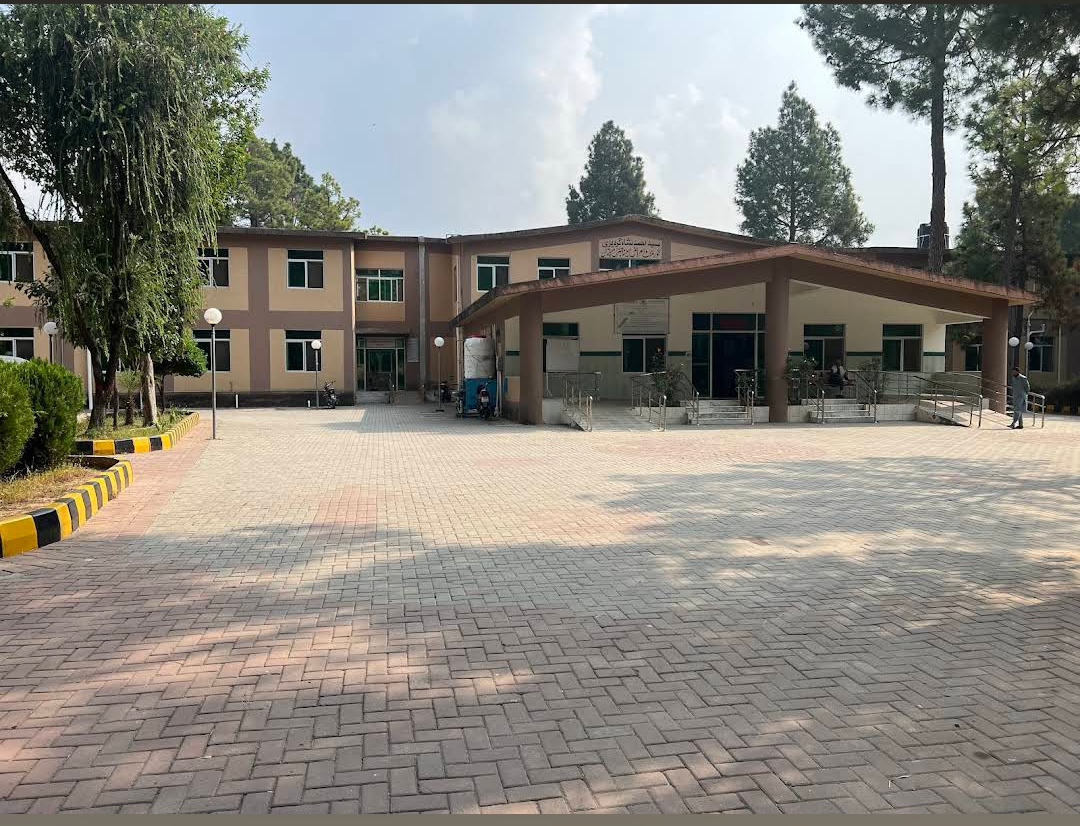
A view of The Chest Diseases and General Hospital (CDGH) in Hill Surang Village.

The Chest Diseases and General Hospital (CDGH), known locally as the Government TB Hospital Hill, is a specialised public medical facility in Hill Surang Village and one of the oldest institutions in Bagh District dedicated to pulmonary care and tuberculosis treatment. The hospital was built on land donated by Syed Ahmed Gardezi. It was located in the mountains to give tuberculosis patients clean air for recovery.

It is located on Dhirkot Road, about 15 kilometres from both Kohala and Dhirkot. It was originally built as a TB sanatorium, but later became a general healthcare facility for the local community. Research conducted in the area includes a published study on the prevalence of hepatitis B and C virus in the general population of Hill Surang.

Educational institutions in Hill Surang include Madrasa Tajveed ul Quran Hill (مدرسہ تجوید القرآن ہل), Read Foundation High School Hill, Government Boys Middle School Hill, Government Girls Middle School Hill, and Government Primary School Cheeran Hill.

== History ==
Hill Surang was badly affected by the 2005 Kashmir earthquake of 8 October 2005. International medical relief teams established emergency camps at the Chest Diseases and General Hospital to treat injured people from the surrounding area. The Pakistan Poverty Alleviation Fund (PPAF) worked across the affected districts of Azad Jammu and Kashmir for relief, reconstruction, and rehabilitation, and they conducted surveys in Hill Surang village to help rebuild houses and water infrastructure.
