= 2024–25 Pakistan federal budget =

2024–25 Pakistani federal budget

2024–2025 Pakistan Federal Budget
Finance Act, 2024
- State emblem of Pakistan
- Submitted: 12 June 2024
- Submitted by: Muhammad Aurangzeb
- Passed: 28 June 2024
- Country: Pakistan
- Government: Second Shehbaz Sharif government
- Party: Pakistan Muslim League (Nawaz) (PML-N)
- Total revenue: ▲ Rs. 17.815 trillion (US$64 billion)
- Total expenditures: ▲ Rs. 18.2 trillion (US$65 billion)
- Debt payment: ▲ Rs. 9.78 trillion (US$35 billion) Interest Repayment
- Surplus: ▲2.0% of GDP
- Deficit: ▼4.9% of GDP
- Debt: 22%
- Website: Finance.gov.pk Budget 2024-25

The 2024–25 Pakistan Federal Budget was the financial statement of the Government of Pakistan's estimated receipts and expenditures for the fiscal year that ran from 1 July 2024 to 30 June 2025.

On 12 June 2024, finance minister Muhammad Aurangzeb presented the federal budget with a total outlay of Rs18.877 trillion, proposed Rs2,000bn in new taxes, and government deficit restrictions under International Monetary Fund conditions. The same day, a copy of the finance bill was moved in the Senate. On 28 June 2024, the National Assembly passed the finance bill. On 30 June 2024, President Asif Ali Zardari gave assent to the finance bill.

On 20th May 2025, after assessing the third quarter of the current Fiscal Year, from January to March 2025, the Pakistan Bureau of Statistics published a report that showed Pakistan's Gross domestic product (GDP) increased positively by 2.4%. This led to Pakistan's GDP increasing to $410.96 Billion with a GDP per Capita of $1,824.

== Background ==
The budget was expected to be a critical one as it is being prepared under the strict conditions of the International Monetary Fund (IMF). The budget was expected to be contractionary, aiming to close the gap between revenue collection and total expenditure. The budget is being prepared with the aim of securing a bailout package from the IMF.

On 10 June 2024, the National Economic Council (NEC) decided to continue funding ongoing provincial projects and constituency-based schemes, while approving a 47 percent increase in the federal Public Sector Development Programme to Rs 1.4 trillion. The NEC also approved the economic growth target of 3.6 percent.

Pakistan is in talks with the IMF for a loan of between $6 billion and $8 billion. This budget is very important for Pakistan's IMF program. The government is required to restrict budget deficits to 5% to 6% of GDP and achieve a primary surplus to meet the IMF's requirements.

== Budget Policies ==
A variety of budget measures were proposed for FY2024-25, including several amendments and changes made to the original budget in the 2024 Finance Act, including revised rates, FATA/PATA exemptions, and new taxes in real-state and construction. The budget also approved a Rs 1.15 trillion Public Sector Development Program (PSDP). The Benazir Income Support Program (BISP) allocation was increased to PKR 592bn, subsidy allocation for the Utility Stores Corporation (USC) was PKR 56bn, and an additional PKR 10bn for the Ramazan package. Government pensions were raised by 15%, a minimum wage of Rs37,000 set, and salaries for government employes were increased. PKR 253bn was allocated for development in the energy sector. A National Fiscal Pact was proposed between the Federal government and provinces.

Custom Duty Measures

- Proposed removal of custom duty exemption on luxury electric car imports.
- Custom duty waiver for imported hybrid electric vehicles revoked.
- Custom duties on steel and paper products have been raised.
- Custom duties on imported glass products have been increased.
- Custom duties on raw materials for registered solar-panel manufacturers reduced.

Sales Tax Measures

- A standard 18% GST rate will now apply to mobile phones priced under US$500.
- Sales tax exemptions, zero ratings, and reductions withdrawn for various products.
- Tier-1 textile and leather retailers will face 18% GST rather than 15%.
- Petroleum products previously zero-rated will now be classified as exempt.
- The default surcharge rate pegged to the policy rate at KIBOR + 3%.
- Milk sold by corporate farms or brands subject to 18% GST.
- Sales tax on iron and steel scrap removed to curb false or "flying" invoices.

Income Tax Measures

- Dividend tax on mutual funds earning 50%+ of income from profit-on-debt increased from 15% to 25%.
- Additional 10% surcharge on salaried individuals and Association of Persons (AoPs) with an income of more than Rs10mn per annum.
- Income-tax rates and slab thresholds for salaried class increased; non-salaried persons/AoPs higher rates and revised thresholds, with a top rate of 45%.
- Advance Withholding Tax (WHT) for wholesalers, retailers, and distributors who are non-filers will increase from 1% to 2.25%.
- WHT applied on coal, paper, copper, and plastic scrap.
- Non-filers pay 35% tax on profit-on-debt, up from 30%.
- Advance tax on vehicles will be based on their value instead of engine size, rates vary by engine capacity.
- Petroleum Development Levy (PDL) on MS and High-Speed Diesel (HSD) increased to PKR 70/liter; on LDO, HOBC, and E-10 it increased by PKR 25/liter to PKR 75/liter.
- Exporters will pay 29% corporate tax rate plus applicable super tax rather than the previous 1% turnover rate.
- 15% Capital Gains Tax (CGT) on securities sales applies to filers regardless of holding period for acquisitions after July 1, 2024.
- CGT on stock mutual funds and CIS income increased from 10% to 15%, 20% if dividends less than capital gains.
- Non-filers' CGT on securities will follow slab-based normal rates (min. 15%, max. 45%), with 15% for gains under PKR 0.6 million.
- Filers pay a flat 15% CGT on immovable property sales, irrespective of holding period.
- Non-filers' CGT on immovable property will align with normal slab rates (15%–45%) based on holding period, with a 15% floor.
- Advance tax on property purchases is introduced, with different rates for filers, non-filers, and late filers.
- Tax rates for non-filers on profit-on-debt, property transfers, and sales to distributors/wholesalers/retailers adjusted.
- The income-tax exemption for the FATA/PATA regions is extended by one year.
- PIACL's period for carrying forward unadjusted business losses extended from six to ten years to aid in privatization.

Federal Excise Duty (FED) Measures

- FED on cement increases by PKR 1/kg (PKR 50/bag) to PKR 4/kg (PKR 100-120/bag).
- FED on acetate tow cigarette filters is set at PKR 44,000/kg.
- 5% FED is imposed on new commercial and residential plot transfers to deter speculation.
- Nicotine pouches will attract a FED of PKR 2,000/kg.
- FED on sugar supplied to manufacturers rises by PKR 15/kg.
- Application of FED on Airway tickets; economy class increased by Rs7,500, club, business and first class increased by Rs30,000, Rs60,000 and Rs100,000 depending on region.
