= Inquilabi National Conference =

The Inquilabi National Conference was a political party in Jammu and Kashmir. The party was founded in 1978, as Mirza Afzal Beg broke away from the Jammu and Kashmir National Conference due to a conflict with the National Conference leader Sheikh Abdullah. Beg resigned from his post as Deputy Chief Minister on September 25, 1978, and announced the formation of the Inquilabi National Conference on October 26, 1978. The Inquilabi National Conference held two seats in the Jammu and Kashmir Legislative Assembly.

In June 1979 the Inquilabi National Conference joined an opposition alliance along with the Awami Action Committee, the Indian National Congress and the Janata Party, with the purpose of opposing the passing of the Representation of the People (Amendment) Bill (which would force the expulsion from the Legislative Assembly of legislators resigning from their party whip or abstaining to vote according to their party whip, a move that was seem as a step towards a single-party regime in the state).

In late September 1981 Beg announced the Inquilabi National Conference dissolved and that he was rejoining the National Conference. Some Inquilabi National Conference workers followed Beg and returned to the National Conference.The remainder of the Inquilabi National Conference party was marginalized. As of 1982 Mohammed Ibrahim Dar was the sole Member of the Legislative Assembly of the Inquilabi National Conference.
