= Thorar Tehsil =

Tehsil in Azad Kashmir, Pakistan

Thorar تھورار
- Tehsil
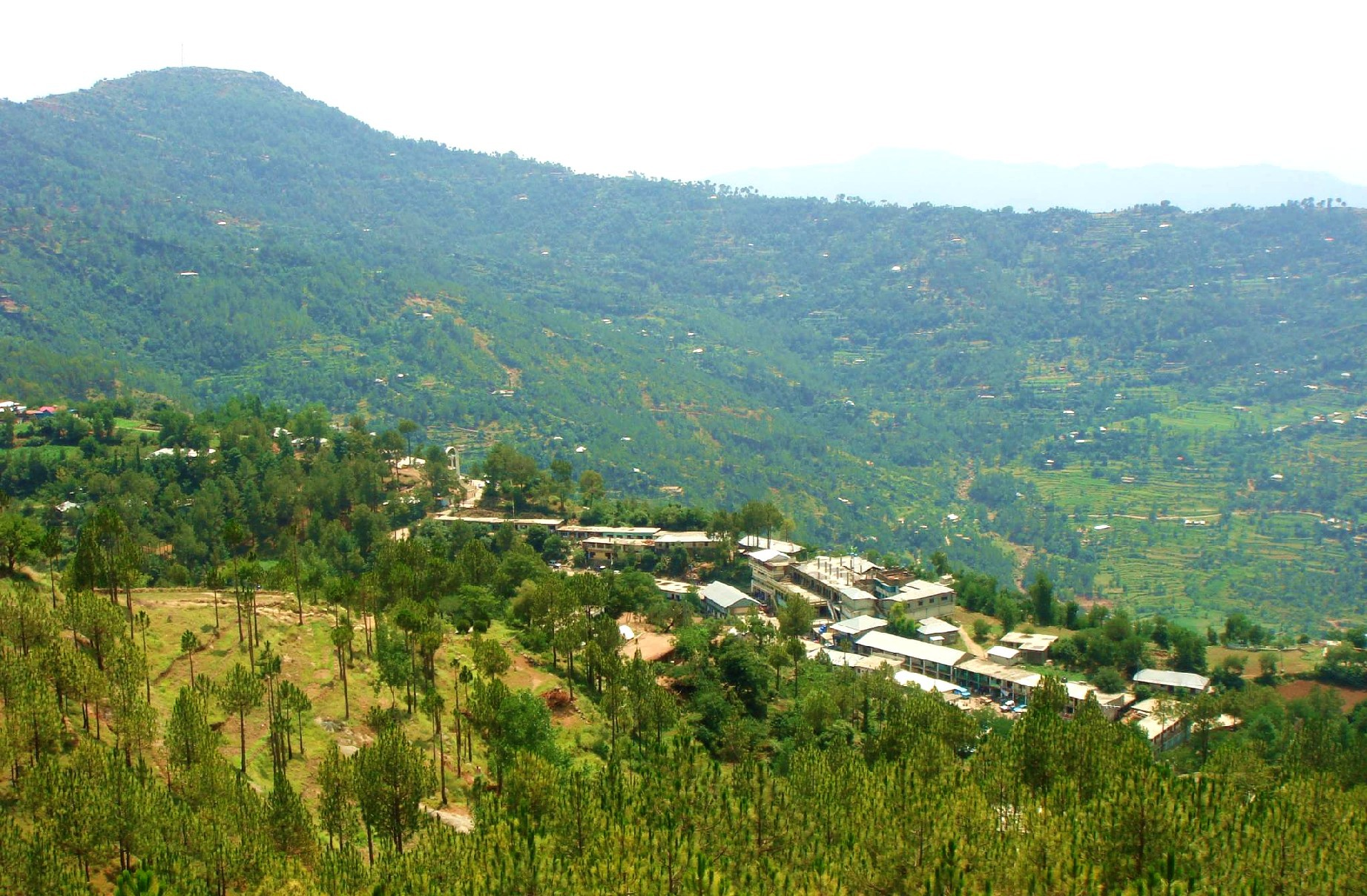
- Thorar in 2007

- Location within Azad Kashmir Location within Pakistan
- Coordinates: 33°51′N 73°39′E
- Administering country: Pakistan
- Territory: Azad Kashmir
- Division: Poonch
- District: Poonch

Area
  - Total: 85 km^{2} (33 sq mi)

Population (2017)
  - Total: 24,958
  - Density: 290/km^{2} (760/sq mi)
- Time zone: UTC+5 (PKT)

Thorar (Urdu: تھورار) is a tehsil of Poonch District in Azad Kashmir, a part of Kashmir administered by Pakistan. As of the 2017 Pakistani census, the population of Thorar was 24,958.

The 2026 Azad Kashmir protests led by the Jammu Kashmir Joint Awami Action Committee were particularly violent in Thorar, with Pakistani authorities blaming the group for attacks on security forces and the setup of barricades across the tehsil.

== History ==
In early September 2014, heavy rains in Azad Kashmir caused flash floods that swept away buildings and killed up to 45 people, including a man in Thorar.

Pakistani police used tear gas and live ammunition against protesters in Thorar on 25 July 2022, wounding at least five people who were then taken to the hospital. Locals had been protesting a recent 20-hour period of load shedding, as well as rising electricity costs.

About 3,000 supporters of the anti-government Jammu Kashmir Joint Awami Action Committee (JKJAAC) departed from Thorar, Mong, and other nearby tehsils to Rawalakot, the district headquarters, on 11 June 2026. They were led by Sardar Arbab, a JKJAAC core member from Thorar. Police dispersed the crowd before they reconvened at the same locations for another protest on 12 June.

One member of the Pakistan Rangers was killed and another wounded when they were fired upon during an operation on 26 August 2026 to clear and reopen blocked roads in the Sarsawa–Thorar–Thal area. Pakistani authorities blamed the JKJAAC.

On 13 September 2026, the Rawalakot District Administration announced that several educational institutions in Thorar and Rawalakot tehsils had been closed due to barricades, protests, and attacks on police that authorities attributed to the JKJAAC.

== Administration and geography ==
Thorar is a tehsil (subdistrict) of Poonch District in Azad Kashmir, a part of Kashmir administered by Pakistan. It covers an area of 85 square kilometres and has jurisdiction over 7 villages within its borders.

== Demographics ==
The 2017 Pakistani census recorded 24,958 people living in 4,621 households in Thorar.
