= Bhalgran =

Pakistani politician and writer

Bhalgran is a village in Poonch District in Azad Kashmir.

== Location ==
Bhalgran is located an hours drive from the capital of Poonch district, the city of Rawalakot.

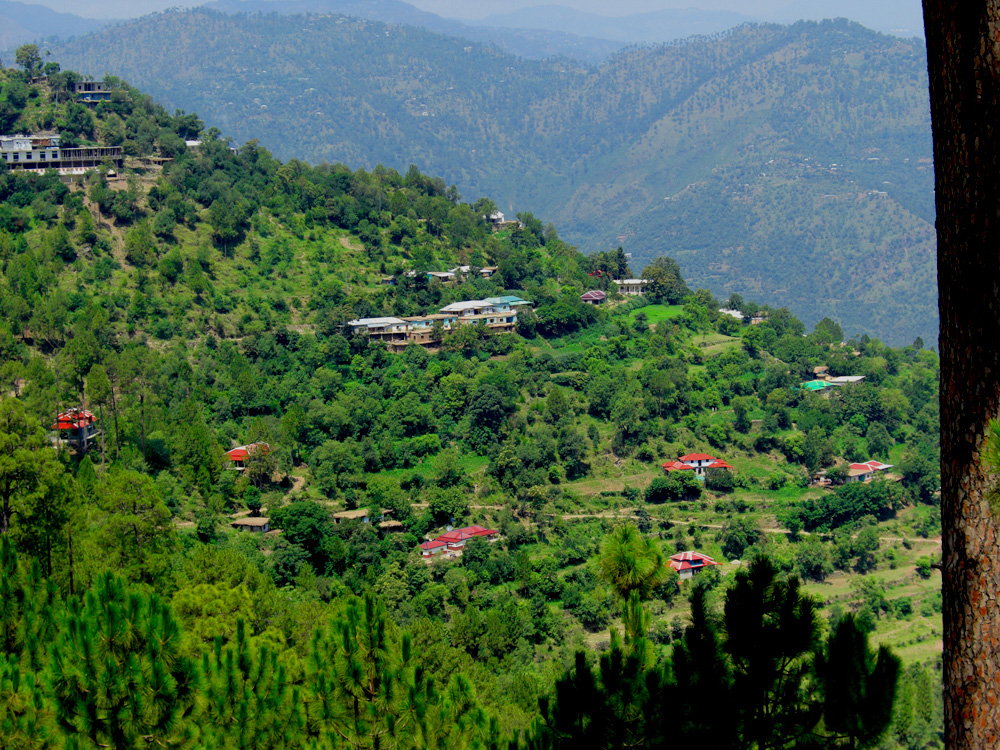
bhalgran view from parath

Village of Thorar is in the east of Bhalgran, while the Jhelum River is located in the west of Bhalgran. It is a beautiful region of this part of Jammu & Kashmir, its sub-parts contain the villages of Sardi, Lway, Dubyern, Rarotha, Chetti Trar, Numb Dumbnota and Hill Koliary.

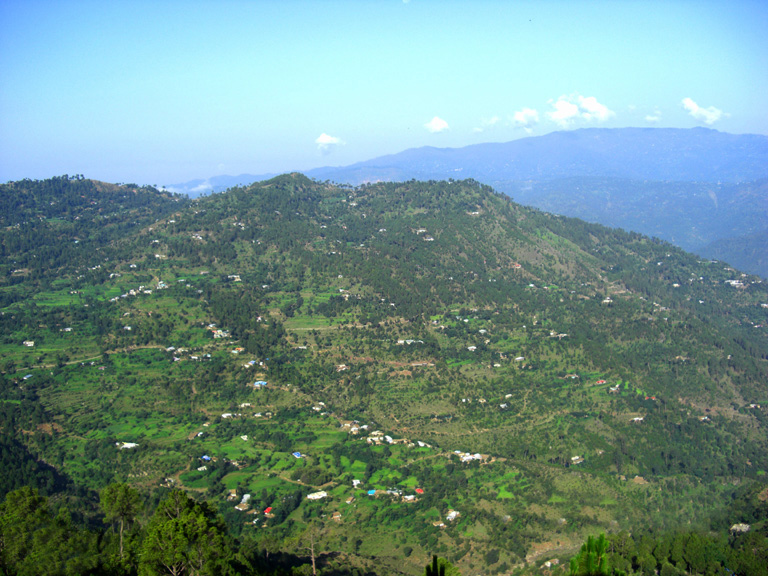
Sardi laway Bhalgran view from Thorar Bazar

It is located 75 kilometres (47 mi) from Kohala. Bhalgran is connected with Rawalpindi and Islamabad via the neighbouring districts of Azad Pattan and Dhalkot, and with Muzaffarabad through Kohalla. Majority of the population in Bhalgran belong to the Sudhun Tribe.

== Literacy ==
Literacy rate of Bhalgran is 85%

== Sports ==
People of this region mostly play volleyball, cricket and Tash(Cards).

== Shopping ==
The town has few good bazaars where all essential commodities of life are easily available.

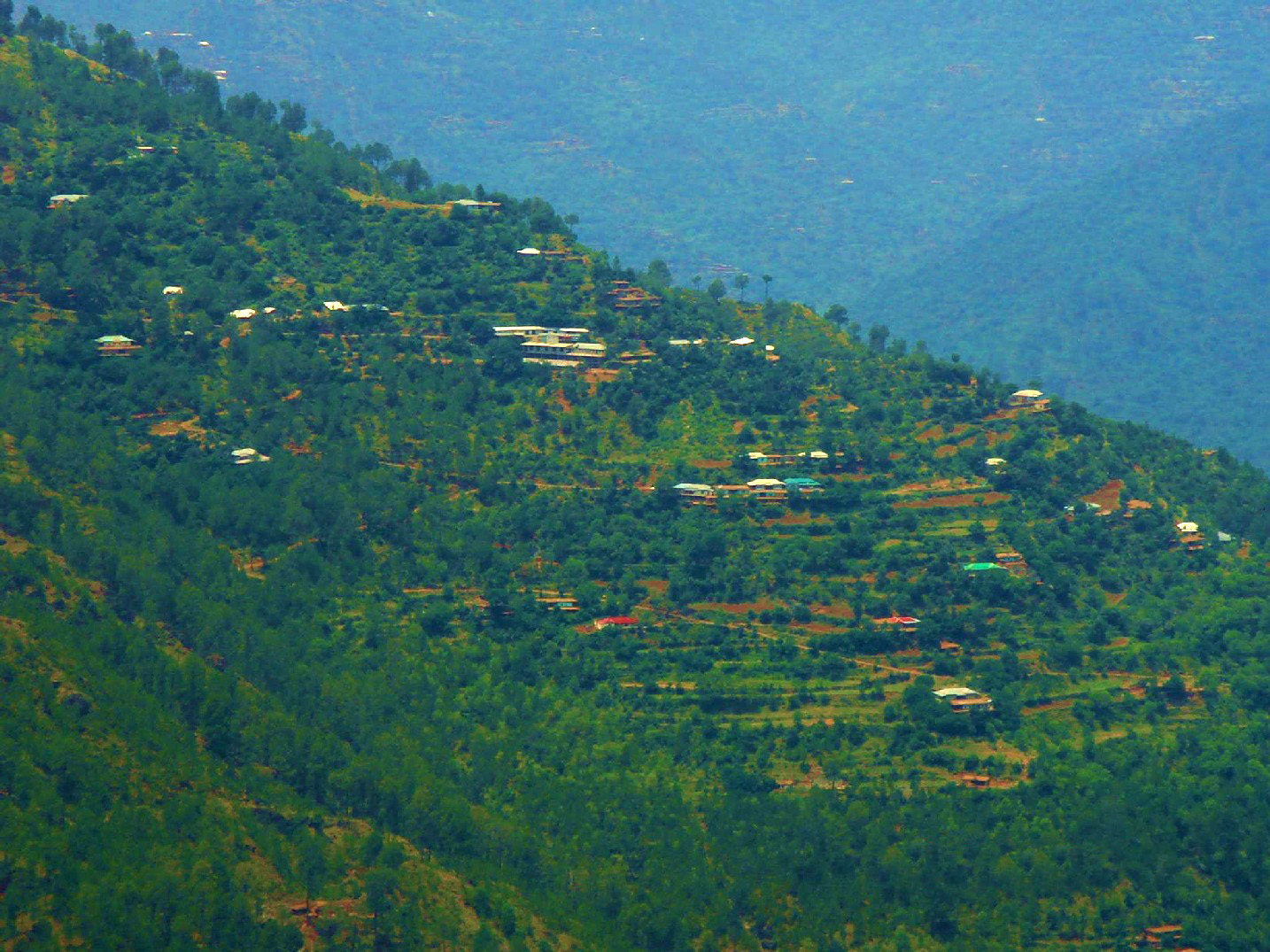
bhalgran view from Ner

== Occupation ==
There is a large diaspora of people from Bhalgran in the Middle East and Europe, as employment opportunities for the population are non-existent, some find employment with the Military or in government departments. The area has subsistence level of farming which is not enough to feed a family.

== Earthquake of 2005 ==
The town suffered significant damage from the 2005 Kashmir earthquake; although most of the buildings were left standing, many of them were rendered uninhabitable, and some of the population was left homeless. Most of the houses have been reconstructed though without the help of the Government of Pakistan or Azad Kashmir.

== RDC Sardi Bhalgran ==
Due lack of Development in area, in early 2017 people of Sardi Bhalgran started this organization, RDC(Regional Development Council).

== Devastating fire of April 2008 ==
A devastating fire have taken place in Bhalgran Markaz, which is the shopping, health, educational, cultural, religious center for the population around. The fire has burnt down most of the markaz (community center). The damage has left the poor storekeepers bank default and rest of the population without the basic facilities of life. That was another blow down for people of Bhalgran after "2005 Earthquake". Bhalgran Rehabilitation Committee has appealed people all over the world to send their donations.

== Pictures ==
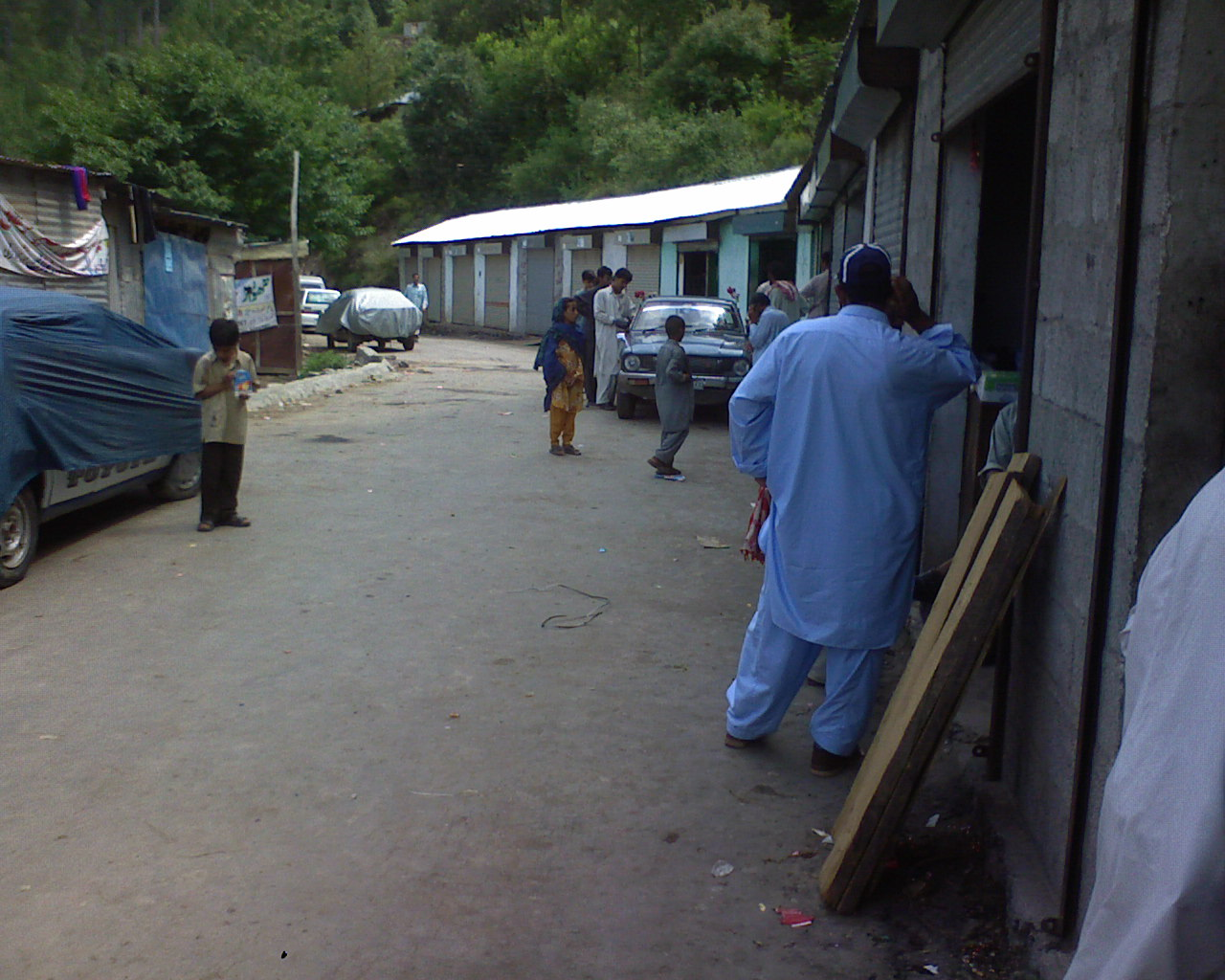
Bhalgran bazar

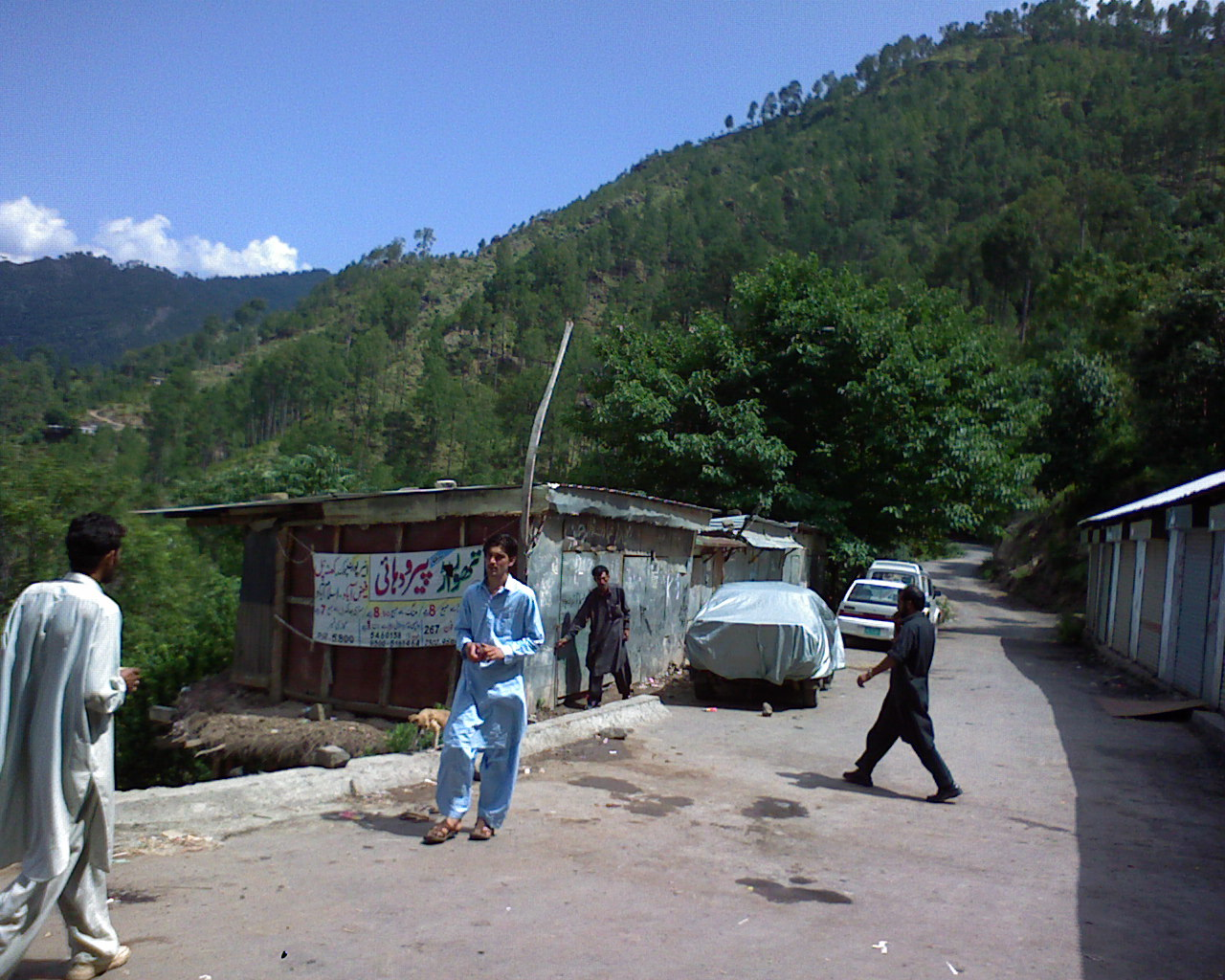
Bhalgran bazar

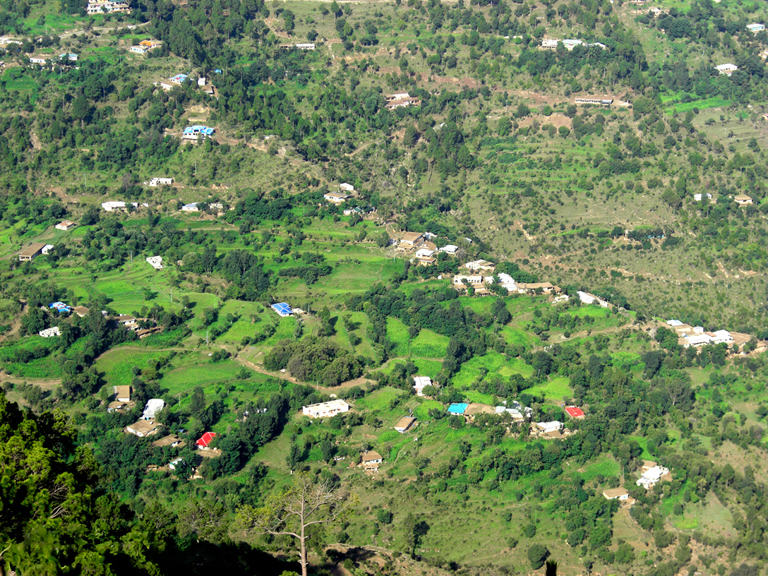
Sardi Bhlagran

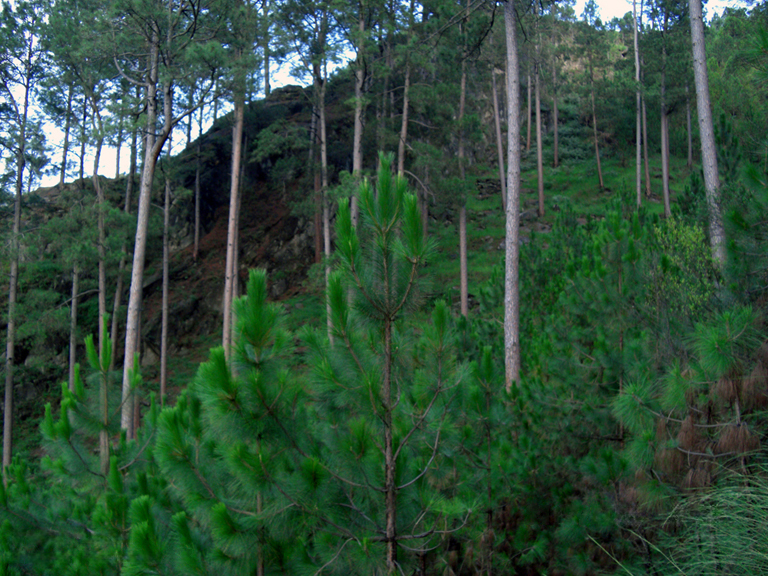
Beauty of Kali Kassi

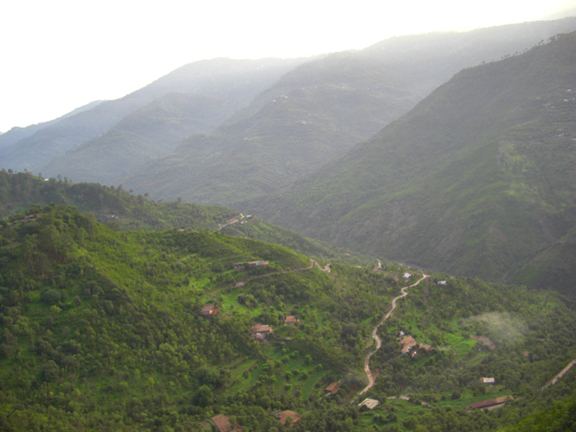
Dubeyrn

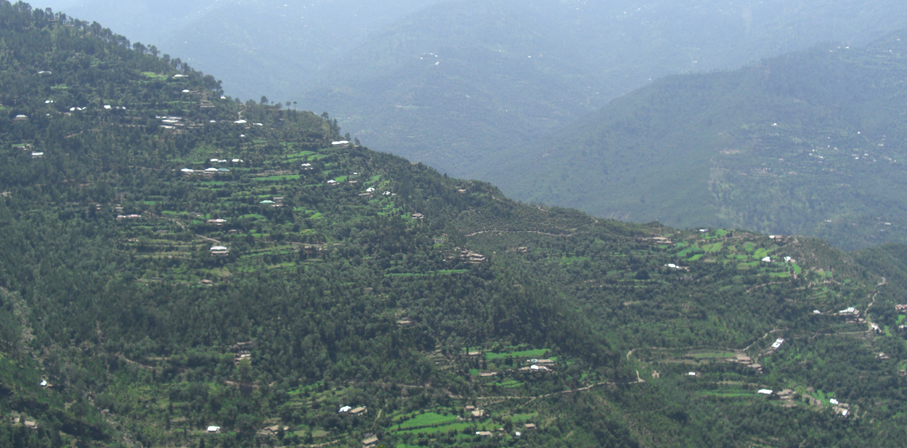
Hill Koliary & chitti thrar

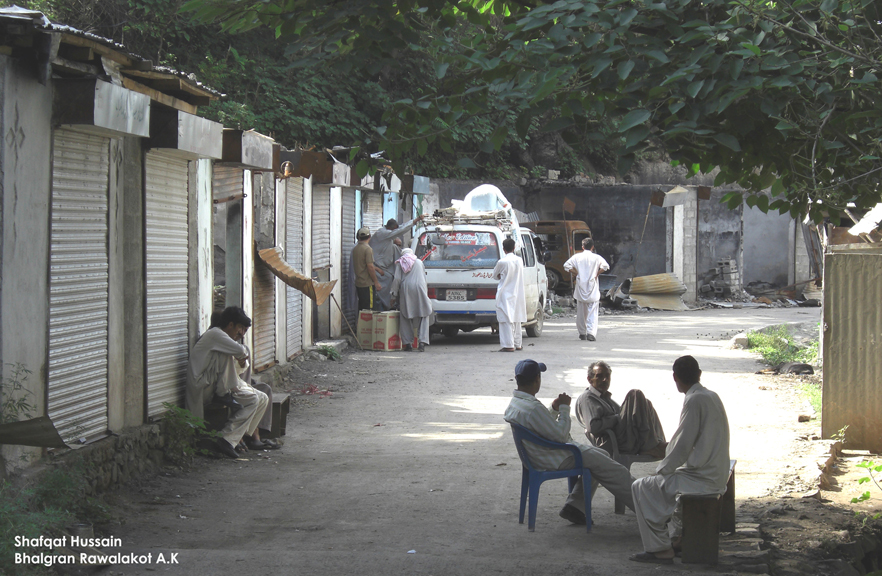
Bhalgran Bazar after fire

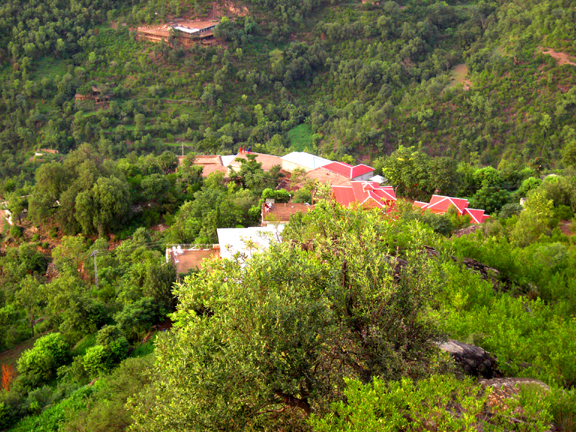
chitti trar

== See also ==
- Thorar
