= Huqooq-e-Sindh March =

Protest march against Sindh Government in Pakistan

- Date: February 26 – March 6, 2022
- Location: Sindh, Pakistan
- Caused by: Alleged corruption and poor governance by the Sindh Government
- Goals: Demand for better governance and accountability
- Methods: Protest march, speeches, charter of demands
- Result: Charter of demands presented to the Sindh Government

Parties
Protesters	Sindh Government

Lead figures
Shah Mehmood Qureshi, Ali Haider Zaidi	Murad Ali Shah

The Huqooq-e-Sindh March (transl. The Sindh Rights March) was a 2022 protest march against the provincial Sindh Government of Sindh, Pakistan. Inaugurated by PTI Vice Chairman Shah Mehmood Qureshi, the march started on February 26 at the Shaheed commune in Ghotki near the Sindh–Punjab border, and ended on March 6 in Karachi.

== March route and timeline ==
The route of the march was scheduled to incorporate 27 districts of the Sindh province, ending in Karachi on March 6.

- February 27 – The march set off from Ghotki, then headed for Sukkur and reached Shikarpur, Kashmore and Jacobabad.
- February 28 – The march passed through Qambar Shahdadkot District and Larkana.
- March 1 – The protesters encamped in Khairpur, Naushahro Feroze and Nawabshah.

Addressing a press conference in Larkana, FM Shah Mahmood Qureshi said that we have excluded Nowshero Feroz, Halani and Kandiaro from the route of the march to avoid the expected clash and violence with the PPP workers.

- March 2 – The next destinations of the march were Sanghar and Mirpur Khas.
- March 3 – Arrival at Umerkot, Tharparker district and Badin, with overnight stay.
- March 4 – Passed through Tando Jan Mohammad, Tando Allahyar and Matiari.
- March 5 – Reached next destination Hyderabad.
- March 6 – March entered its final phase and returned to Karachi from Jamshoro.

At the conclusion of the march, speeches were made by central PTI leaders in front of a large gathered crowd, and a charter of demands for the PPP was read out by PTI Sindh president, Ali Haider Zaidi.

== See also ==
- PPP long march
- Gwadar protest
- 2023 Pakistani protests
- 2023–2024 Gilgit-Baltistan Protests
