= 2024 Azad Kashmir protests =

Protests in Pakistan-administrated Azad Kashmir

- Date: 8–14 May 2024 (1 week)
- Location: Azad Jammu and Kashmir
- Result: Government accept all of protestors' demands: 23b PKR ($82m) grant given to Azad Kashmir; Government subsidises wheat price; Government subsidises electricity prices; Judicial Commission to review privileges of top officials

Parties
| Government of Pakistan; Government of Azad Kashmir | Jammu Kashmir Joint Awami Action Committee (JKJAAC) |

Lead figures
| Asif Ali Zardari (President of Pakistan); Shehbaz Sharif (Prime Minister of Pakistan); Sultan Mehmood Chaudhry (President of Azad Kashmir); Chaudhry Anwar-ul-Haq (Prime Minister of Azad Kashmir); Waqar Noor (Interior Minister of Azad Kashmir) | Shaukat Nawaz Mir (JKJAAC chairman); Amjad Ali Khan (JKJAAC core committee member); Imtiaz Aslam (JKJAAC senior leader); Hafeez Hamdani (JKJAAC spokesperson); Local parties and councils (JAAC claim) |

Units involved
| Azad Kashmir Police; Punjab Rangers; Frontier Constabulary; Punjab Constabulary | Protestors |

Number
| Azad Kashmir Police (8,000); Punjab Constabulary (600); Frontier Constabulary (6 platoons); Punjab Rangers (1300+) | Unknown; 40,000 (Ex-AJK PM claim) |

Casualties and losses
| 1 police officer killed; 78 police injured | Protests: 3 killed; 28 arrested (DC claim); Pre-protest: 70 arrested (minister claim) |

The 2024 Azad Kashmir protests were a series of six day long protests, sit-ins, shutter-downs, demonstrations and wheel-jam strikes starting on 8 May against the Federal Government of Pakistan and the Government of Azad Kashmir, calling for lower prices for wheat, flour, and electricity, in addition to other demands. Many of the protests were organized by the Jammu Kashmir Joint Awami Action Committee (JKJAAC) of Azad Kashmir, representing a variety of interests including traders, transporters, lawyers and students. The government attempted to preempt a planned demonstration on 12 May by arresting the movement's leaders, which inflamed protests and led to deadly clashes. The protests were the culmination of a year-long movement against price rises and perceived injustices towards Azad Kashmir. The Federal government announced a Rs23 Billion ($82,685,321) grant to Azad Kashmir, which led to subsidized utility rates and wheat prices being announced on May 13, by the Prime Minister of AJK, Chaudhry Anwar-ul-Haq. On May 14, the JAAC called off the protests, announcing a 'historic win' as the government agreed to all demands.

== Background ==
=== Recent developments ===
From 2022 Pakistan experienced increased economic malaise, flooding and political unrest that fueled discontent; with headline inflation at a 38pc, 700,000 Pakistani's losing their jobs, unsustainable debt levels and fiscal burdens. Floods in 2022 led to more than 33 million losing their homes, land or jobs, the death of 800,000 livestock and the destruction of 28,000 schools, with severe impacts on Pakistan's economy. Inflated electricity rates began led to increased public anger, leading to nationwide shutdowns and strikes in "practically all of Pakistan's major cities." Suicides by power consumers unable to pay electricity bills peaked in August 2023 which saw a hike in electricity bills. Prices of essential commodities including flour, rice and wheat increased, as statistics of the Pakistan Bureau of Statistics (PBS) in July 2023 indicated the country had reached record flour prices. Protests began in 2023 in Gilgit-Baltistan over the rise in subsidized wheat prices, rising from Rs20 to Rs36 per kg. The government of GB initially planned to increase the rate to Rs52/kg. CM of GB Gulbar Khan and GB Food Minister Ghulam Muhammad instead announced a per month 7 kg transfer to each individual. Ghulam Muhammad claimed that rates in price were made by the previous government under Khalid Khurshid Khan and was based on fluctuating transportation rates. Controversial General elections held in February 2024 saw the election of a fragmented and polarized mandate.

=== Protests in Azad Kashmir ===
The protests in Azad Kashmir began in May 2023, in the town of Rawalakot, the headquarters of Poonch District. They were started by a few sit-in protestors against rising prices of wheat flour and electricity. They were soon followed by a boycott of electricity bills, which went unpaid in most areas of Azad Kashmir. The protestors maintain that the power projects in Azad Kashmir generate 3,000 megawatts of cheap electricity, a third of Pakistan's power generation, but the Azad Kashmir consumers are charged prices five times the cost of production. (Note: In fact, according to some reports the prices charged per unit of electricity are as high as 30 Pakistani Rupees, compared to the production cost of around 2 rupees.) This is said to be in violation of the Constitution of Pakistan which prohibits the government of Pakistan from making a profit from the residents of Azad Kashmir.

Several rounds of negotiations between the governments of Azad Kashmir and Pakistan, as well as those between the Joint Awami Action Committee (JAAC) and the government of Azad Kashmir have failed to produce results, leading the movement to call for more autonomy in accordance with the mandate given by the United Nations to Pakistan during the Kashmir conflict. In September 2023, protests were held in all major towns of Azad Kashmir with thousands of protestors, and traders' associations, transporters and lawyers observed a strike. A call for strike was also given for 5 February 2024, which is normally observed as the Kashmir Solidarity Day. Muzaffarabad Public Action Committees called for a "long march" to Muzaffarabad, the capital of Azad Kashmir, on Saturday, 11 May, to come from all parts of Azad Kashmir. The Federal Government mobilized 600 personnel of Punjab Constabulary and an unspecified number of Frontier Constabulary in a bid to block the march.

The AJK Joint Awami Action Committee (JAAC) made ten demands to the government:

- Wheat subsidy similar to Gilgit-Baltistan
- Electricity tariff should be determined from the cost of electricity production from the Mangla Hydropower Project in AJK
- Unnecessary perks and privileges of the ruling class and officials should be eliminated
- Restrictions on student unions should be lifted, and elections should be conducted
- Kashmir Bank should be scheduled
- Municipal representatives should be given funds and powers
- Cellular companies and internet services should be standardized
- Property transfer taxes should be reduced
- Accountability Bureau should be made active in AJK and amendments should be made to the Act
- Practical restrictions should be imposed on tree cutting and legislation should be enacted to revitalize the local wood industry

The JAAC has denied any allegations of being supported by India, saying its demands are for the welfare of the people of the region and has no ulterior motive. Imtiaz Aslam, a JAAC leader has stated that the group is self-funded and further remarked "Our fight is not with the state of Pakistan. We are only arguing against the corrupt rule of the current government here. This is what government always does, whenever anybody tries to raise voice, they allege an Indian connection. This demand for lower prices and greater autonomy highlights the tension between local economic struggles and the policies of the central government, with the people of Azad Kashmir seeking not only financial relief but also greater political representation."

== Government response ==
=== Federal grant and subsidies ===
On 13 May, Prime Minister Shehbaz Sharif announced the provision of Rs. 23 billion ($82,685,321) to AJK. Following the injection of the Federal grant, the Premier of AJK, Chaudhry Anwarul Haq announced a subsidized rate of Rs. 2,000 per 40 kilograms of flour, down from the previous Rs. 3,100, also notifying a reduction in electricity prices; Rs3 per kilowatt-hour (kWh) for 1–100 unit consumption, Rs5 per kWh for 100–300 unit consumption, and Rs6 per kWh for consumption above 300 units. With commercial unit price fixed at Rs10 for 1-300 units and Rs15 for above 300 units. Clarifying that it was a "permanent arrangement," and that it would be included in the up-coming 2024-25 Pakistan Federal Budget. This came after a meeting between the Federal government and AJK ministers and leaders. The Joint Awami Action Committee remained "cautious" on the government response, demanding "written document and not a verbal announcement," requesting formal government notification. Chaudhry Anwarul Haq claimed that the government had accepted "all demands of Awami Action Committee," and "notified subsidies on food and electricity." The government also established a judicial commission to review the privileges of top government officials in AJK. On the same day the AJK government had Yasin Qureshi, Deputy Inspector General (DIG) of Muzaffarabad transferred, and appointed Irfan Masood Kashfi in his place. Pakistan Today and Hum News also claimed that the government was planning to change Muzaffarabad Commissioner Masoodul Rehman with Adnan Khrushid.

=== Acceptance by the Awami Action Committee ===
Following this, on 14 May, the JAAC called off protests. "The government accepted all the demands of the protesters yesterday", remarked one JAAC representative, adding "The shutterdown strike is being called off." JAAC Leader Shaukat Nawaz Mir said "[Our protest] movement had three basic demands [which were] cheap flour, cheap electricity and the abolition of privileges for the elite [class]", to Geo News, expressing felicitations to the Prime Minister Shehbaz Sharif accepting the protestors demands after more than a year. The JAAC entered into an agreement with the government to release all those arrested and drop all cases according to JAAC Core Committee member Amjad Ali Khan. He also called for the compensation of the three protestors killed in clashes with Rangers and a judicial commission to investigate police violence. Abdul Majid Khan, a spokesperson for the AJK government claimed that "All the demands of the protesters have been fulfilled, and the situation will hopefully return to normalcy now." Attaullah Tarar, Federal Information Minister claimed that the situation was addressed due to the Federal grant to AJK. According to Shaukat Nawaz Mir, the suspension of Internet services by the government prevented news of successful talks from reaching protestors.

== Timeline ==
=== 9 May ===
In the intervening night of 8 and 9 May, the police arrested around 70 JAAC activists after raiding their residences and those of their relatives in Muzaffarabad and Mirpur divisions. In Muzaffarabad, the arrested activists included Shaukat Nawaz Mir, the elected leader of traders, and several other members of the action committee. In Mirpur's Dadyal Tehsil, a dozen activists were arrested, provoking clashes with traders on 9 May.

A government vehicle was set ablaze by protestors. The government responded by deploying 5,500 police. The Inspector General of Police claimed that Indian Intelligence Agencies were involved. The Federal Cabinet after a consultation session approved the deployment of Frontier Constabulary (FC) in Azad Kashmir for the security of Chinese nationals in Pakistan and to assist the Azad Kashmir police and government. The Mirpur District Administration issued prohibitory orders under section 144 Cr.PC imposing bans on gatherings of five or more across the district, with violators to be punished under section 188 Cr.PC.

=== 10 May ===
JAAC responded to the clashes by announcing its closure of business and calling for a strike on 11 May. The committee also spearheaded shutter-down and wheel-jam strikes across the region. Shaukat Nawaz Mir issued a video saying that due to the "brutal attitude" of the authorities in Dadyal the protests for May 11 would be shifted to May 10. The Government of Azad Kashmir declared a two-day holiday for "security reasons." AJK Interior Minister Col. (retd) Waqar Ahmed Noor claimed that the government "did not want to 'clash' with anyone and neither has it had any intention," and said that the government was ready to hold talks. 600 security personnel were deployed to Muzaffarabad by the government.

=== 11 May ===
Heavy police forces were deployed along the ways leading to Madina Market where a JAAC reception was held. Routes leading to Muzaffarabad were blocked with barricades as Shahrah-e-Srinagar. The News reports that near Mirpur's Islam Garh protests turned violent as firing on police trying to block the way of protestors led to ASI Adnan Qureshi being shot in the chest. Clashes were reported from Sultan Shah Bridge, Tanga Stand and Aziz Chowk in Muzaffarabad. More than 40 people, including 11 policemen were injured as a result. Kotli SSP stated that a total of 78 policemen were injured; some 59, including DSP Ilyas Janjua and two revenue department officials were injured in Rehaan Galli while another 19 were injured in Sehnsa Baroiyan. District Headquarters Hospital Kotli also stated that nine injured protestors were brought for treatment. JAAC spokesperson Hafeez Hamdani said that the action committee had nothing to do with the violence and stated "It seems that such elements have been purposely planted in the ranks of protesters to bring a bad name to a struggle that aims nothing but the legitimate rights of the people." AJK Finance Minister Abdul Majid Khan claimed the government exercised “maximum restraint" and was open for talks. An official vehicle was set on fire in the Rihan area. AJK police resorted to baton charge and teargas shelling to disperse protestors. In a statement a PTI spokesperson called the government a "curse" for the people. PML-N regional president Shah Ghulam Qadir termed the situation "inappropriate," while Former AJK premier and senior PML-N leader Raja Farooq Haider urged peaceful protest. Former President of Pakistan, Arif Alvi criticised the governments "[R]udimentary idea that: 'Force is the only solution to all human problems.'"

=== 12 May ===
On the 12th of May an article in Dawn stated that after 48 hours of violent clashes the situation in Muzaffarabad seemed "to have calmed down," with the Ranger detachment from Kohala withdrawn from Azad Kashmir. A meeting was held between Prime Minister Shehbaz Sharif, President Asif Ali Zardari, Sultan Mehmood Chaudhry, and Chaudhry Anwarul Haq, and over the escalating tensions.

Reports of Rangers in Poonch and Muzaffarabad emerged, and it was reported some 1300 had been deployed. Mobile phone and internet services were suspended in different parts of AJK today including Bhimber and Bagh Towns. AJK Minister for Rural Development Faisal Mumtaz Rathore stated that the rangers, due to the intervention of President Asif Ali Zardari were "called back as soon as they entered Azad Kashmir" due to the situation calming down. In the aftermath of protests, JAAC leader Shaukat Nawaz Mir stated that the committee is a peaceful organization willing to negotiate with the government. Stating "We have been peaceful for the last year and always will be a peaceful movement. This territory and its institutions and police are our own.” He also supported the governments decision to withdraw rangers from the area but criticized the federal government's fiscal practices and not providing for the people and state bureaucrats.

The Government responded to the protests by suspending Internet in the Region while Prime Minister of Azad Kashmir offered to reconcile with talks and to negotiate with the JAAC and said that they had already worked out 99% of the demands. The Protestors continued their long march on the Regional Capital Muzaffarabad although they set out on foot rather than vehicles, heading to Rawalakot and other regions to hold rallies. At the time as per some reports, President Zardari ordered rangers to pull out of the situation. Prime Minister Shehbaz Sharif prepared to hold a meeting the next day on the 13th with his Cabinet, Interior Ministry Officials, Azad Kashmir Government Officials among others. President Zardari requested patience from both sides to work out an agreement.

Between 5 pm PKT to 10 pm PKT, it was reported in the media that the Government had agreed to the demands of the JAAC to deal with the problems. Bol News reported that the agreement remained inconclusive. Prime Minister Shehbaz Sharif said on Sunday peaceful protests were a democratic right, but there should be “no tolerance” for violence.

=== 13 May ===
The Pakistani prime minister announced a relief package to meet the protestors' demands. A Pakistan Rangers convoy, which was presumably on its way out of Azad Kashmir, entered Muzaffarabad, and was pelted with stones by the protestors. Rangers opened fire at demonstrators blocking their way, leading to several injuries, at least three of the wounded died. Locals torched a vehicle of the Pakistan Rangers as the convoy attempted to reach Muzaffarabad. Schools, business and government offices have remained shut down. Internet services that were suspended since the 12th were briefly restored until being taken down again as violence intensified. That JAAC did not announce if it would accept the governments offer and end the protests. According to Pakistan Today, "peace and calm appear to have returned to Azad Jammu and Kashmir on the third day of demonstrations," further remarking "while normal life remains disrupted with businesses shuttered and public transport halted in various cities." Adding that in areas such as Samahni, Barnala and Bhimber "daily life was going on as usual." Additional police forces were removed from entry and exit points of Bhimber, as it was claimed business centres were opening up and traffic flowing normally. Deputy Commissioner (DC) Muzaffarabad Nadeem Janjua confirmed that 28 individuals had been arrested during the protests under charges of attacking police and causing damage to vehicles. PTI spokesman Raoof Hasan and former PM of Azad Kashmir, Abdul Qayyum Khan Niazi said that PTI was deeply concerned "about the fast-deteriorating situation in AJK," and claimed that the government was "pursuing the policy of Narendra Modi." Urging the government to analyze the motives of the public protests and recognize the demands of the protestors. Abdul Qayyum Niazi called for the resignation of the current AJK government and the calling of fresh elections. He claimed that there were 40,000 protests on the streets. JAAC spokesman Hafeez Hamdani said to the media that the JAAC had no relation with the violence.

=== 14 May ===
On 14 May it was reported that the Joint Awami Action Committee (JAAC) announced it would call off the ongoing protests in AJK. "The government accepted all the demands of the protesters yesterday," remarked one JAAC representative, adding "The shutterdown strike is being called off." However, notifying that state-wide shutter down would be observed until 3:00 pm to honour the people killed in the protests. Earlier in the day the JAAC announced a "black day" to honour the three people who had died in clashes with state agencies. This came after the announcement in wheat subsidies and the reduction of electricity rates at production cost following the Rs23 billion Federal package to Azad Kashmir. JAAC leader Shaukat Nawaz Mir supported the Prime Minister's acceptance of their demands after more than a year, further lamenting the suspension in internet services which according to him prevented news of successful talks from reaching the protestors. Amjad Ali Khan, a member of the JAAC core committee speaking about the details of the JAAC agreement with the government said that the authorities agreed to drop all cases and release arrested individuals. He also said the JAAC demanded compensation for the three demonstrators killed in clashes with Rangers and called for a judicial commission to investigate police violence. Abdul Majid Khan, a spokesperson for the AJK government claimed that “All the demands of the protesters have been fulfilled, and the situation will hopefully return to normalcy now." Responding to another demand, the government established a judicial commission to review the privileges of top government officials in Azad Kashmir. The JAAC also denied any claims of being supported by India, stating "our fight is not with the state of Pakistan"

== After the protests ==
In November 2024, six months after initial protests, the AJK government promulgated the 'Peaceful Assembly and Public Order Ordinance 2024', with divisional commissioner of Muzaffarabad saying "[u]nder this ordinance, any gathering or assembly in AJK requires a written application for permission to be submitted to the district magistrate at least seven days in advance." In designated areas. Two writ petitions against the ordinance were dismissed by a bench of the Azad Kashmir High Court. The ordinance resulted in protests, the arrest of four and rallies in Rawalkot's Supply Baazar. On November 22, Dawn reported 30 people including eight policemen were injured in protests led by local factions of Jammu Kashmir Liberation Front (JKLF), National Awami Party (NAP), and National Students Federation (NSF).

== See also ==
- 2025 Azad Kashmir protests
- 2026 Azad Kashmir protests
