= Chirala, Azad Kashmir =

Village in Bagh District, Pakistan

Chirala
- Union council
- Location within Azad Kashmir
- Coordinates: 33.967823°N 73.578047°E
- Country: Pakistan
- State: Azad Kashmir
- District: Bagh
- Tehsil: Dhirkot

Government
  - Member District Council: Sardar Javed Arif Abbasi (Independent)

Population
  - Total: 14,500

Languages
  - Official: Urdu, Pahari
- Time zone: UTC+5:00 (PST)
- Postal code: 12620

Chirala (چڑالہ)[ ] is a village and Union Council of Dhirkot Tehsil in the Bagh District of Azad Kashmir.

== Geography ==
Chirala is a hilltop village near the confluence of the Mahl River with the Jhelum River. Beyond the Mahl River to the south is the Poonch District. West of the Jhelum River is the Punjab province of Pakistan.

Other villages near Chirala are Narakot, Makhyala, and Sahlian.

== History ==
Prior to 1947, Chirala had a military outpost of the Jammu and Kashmir State Forces. In October 1947, it was defended by two Gorkha companies of the 7th Battalion of the State Forces, commanded by Captains Dalbir Singh and Lachman Dass. At the beginning of October, the post was attacked by the Poonch rebels and subjected to "continuous mortar and medium machine-gun fire".

Reinforcements were sent from Srinagar on 3 October, consisting of two companies of the 8th Battalion under Lt. Col. Maluk Singh . After passing Kohala, the force found that "every ridge, hilltop and track-bend" was held by the rebels, offering stiff resistance. The reinforcements eventually reached the post on 7 October and evacuated the Gorkhas and the refugees taking shelter there. En route to Bagh, the forces again faced rebels. After a stiff fight at Aria, they reached Bagh on 13 October. Abdul Haq Suharwardy states that the rebel resistance was organised by Sardar Abdul Qayyum Khan.

Chirala thus came into rebel hands and became part of Azad Kashmir.

== Etymology ==
This town is surrounded by the trees of Pine (چیڑ), thus result the name چیڑ والہ which means a place with trees of Pine and later it became Chirala (چیڑالہ).

== Politics ==
The main political parties from this area are Pakistan Tareek e Insaaf(PTI), Muslim Conference, Jamaat e Islami, Peoples Party, PML (N), JUI, JKLF, and others.

Sardar Attique Ahmed Khan is a Member of the Legislative Assembly of Azad Kashmir (MLA). He defeated Sardar Latif Khalique Abbasi. Sardar Javed Arif Abbasi is a Member of the District Council of District Bagh from Chirala. Sardar Abdul Qadoos Abbasi is the chairman of the local council Chirala.

== Education ==
- Government Boys Inter College Chirala
- Government Girls Higher Secondary School Chirala
- Iqra Public School and College
- Read Foundation School & College
- Allama Iqbal Science Degree College
- Govt. Boys High School: Sohawa Sharif, Khapaddr, Doonga Khetar, Kasal Kather
- Govt. Girls High School: Sohawa Sharif, Seri Bandi.
