= 2023–2024 Gilgit-Baltistan protests =

2023-2024 Gilgit-Baltistan protests
- Date: 22 December 2023 – January 2024
- Location: Protests were held in Gilgit-Baltistan and other towns
- Caused by: Increase in Wheat Price by Government
- Goals: Demand for the reduction in wheat pricesOngoing
- Methods: Demonstrations; Protest; Sit-ins

Parties
Awami Action Committee: Local people of Gilgit and nearby areas	Government of Pakistan: Government of Gilgit-Baltistan

The 2023–2024 Gilgit-Baltistan Protests, or Wheat protests in Gilgit-Baltistan were a series of protests, sit-ins, and demonstrations against the Federal Government of Pakistan and the Government of Gilgit-Balitistan in response to the dramatic increase in wheat prices in the region. Many of the protests have been organized by the Awami Action Committee.

== Background ==
The sudden increase in prices of wheat sparked protests in Gilgit-Baltistan against the Government of Gilgit-Balitistan and the federal government. The price of the then subsidized wheat has been raised by the GB government from Rs20 kg to Rs36 kg, which had already increased from Rs12 per kilogram to Rs20 per kg in June 2023 by the administration, which was led by the then Chief Minister Khalid Khurshid Khan.

== Protests ==
Several political parties, civil society organizations, labor unions, and representatives of the travel and tourism industries were among the protestors who voiced their dissatisfaction with the GB administration on Friday, 22 December 2023 during a march that left Jamma Masjid and went to Yadgar-i-Shuhada in Skardu, In addition to other locations in Diamer, Nagar, Hunza, Astore, Ghanche, Ghizer, Shigar, and Kharmang, the protests were staged on Tuesday at Yadgar-i-Shuhada Skardu, Siddiq-i-Akbar Chowk Chillas, and Etehad Chowk Gilgit.

Following talks with the government, the Awami Action Committee, a collection of regional political, religious, and local parties, has resolved to stage protests indefinitely. GB Chief Minister Gulber Khan stated that the federal government was requesting increases in the price of wheat on a regular basis.

Despite the protests, the government hasn't shown interest in lowering the wheat prices and the cooperation between the Finance minister Muhammad Ismail and the government has not resulted in any change.

Despite the protests starting on 22 December 2023. However, the protests were officially called on 23 December.

== Reactions ==
- "We completely reject the government’s decision to increase the wheat prices. Gilgit-Baltistan is a disputed region and the onus is on the government to provide subsidies on 28 things (wheat, salt, sugar, petrol) due to its territorial dispute," The AAC chairman for Baltistan, Najaf Ali.
- The regional government, according to GB Food Minister Ghulam Muhammad, has made an effort to "Minimize the burden" on the populace, "Initially, the federal government proposed to increase the wheat price from Rs2,100 to Rs 5,200 per 100kg bag. However, we set the wheat price per bag at Rs3,600 instead of Rs5,200."

== See also ==
- List of protests in Pakistan
- 2022 Azadi March II
- 2022 Karachi protests
- 2023 Pakistani protests
