= Dhirkot Tehsil =

Tehsil in Azad Kashmir, Pakistan

Dhirkot دھیرکوٹ
- Tehsil
- View of the Pir Panjal Range from Neela Butt

- Location within Azad Kashmir Location within Pakistan
- Coordinates: 34°02′21″N 73°34′37″E
- Administering country: Pakistan
- Territory: Azad Kashmir
- Division: Poonch
- District: Bagh

Area
  - Total: 261 km^{2} (101 sq mi)

Population (2017)
  - Total: 130,035
  - Density: 498/km^{2} (1,290/sq mi)
- Time zone: UTC+5 (PKT)

Dhirkot (Urdu: دھیرکوٹ) is a tehsil of Bagh District in Azad Kashmir, a part of Kashmir administered by Pakistan. As of the 2017 Pakistani census, the population of Dhirkot was 130,035.

The tehsil saw significant violence during the 2025 and 2026 Azad Kashmir protests led by the Jammu Kashmir Joint Awami Action Committee.

== History ==
A fire in Dhirkot's main market destroyed 25 shops on 28 November 2018. Authorities determined that the fire was caused by a short circuit at a timber stall, which ignited flames that quickly spread to the 25 wooden shops. Responding firefighters were delayed due to their vehicle suffering a mechanical failure while en route to the fire. No casualties were reported, but authorities estimated the damage to be in the millions of rupees.

On 2 October 2025, amid regional protests against the government, Pakistani police clashed with supporters of the Jammu Kashmir Joint Awami Action Committee (JKJAAC) who were marching through Dhirkot. A convoy of 2,000 protesters had begun their walk from the tehsils of Bagh and Rawalakot, en route to the regional capital Muzaffarabad. Police ultimately opened fire on the protesters, killing four civilians. By the time the violence subsided, a total of 16 people had been injured, including both civilians and police officers.

Shaukat Nawaz Mir, a prominent leader of the banned anti-government Jammu Kashmir Joint Awami Action Committee, was arrested alongside an associate in a raid on his home in Dhirkot on 30 June 2026. He had been accused of inciting violence during protests earlier that month and had been charged with sedition, with authorities offering a ₨10,000,000 reward for information leading to his capture.

== Administration and geography ==
Dhirkot is a tehsil (subdistrict) of Bagh District in Azad Kashmir, a part of Kashmir administered by Pakistan. It covers an area of 261 square kilometres and has jurisdiction over 61 villages within its borders.

== Demographics ==
The 2017 Pakistani census recorded 130,035 people living in 22,889 households in Dhirkot.

== Transportation ==
The Kohala–Dhirkot Road is a major route that passes through the Chamankot area of the tehsil. It connects the regional capital Muzaffarabad and the national capital Islamabad with the four districts of Poonch Division: Bagh, Haveli, Poonch, and Sudhnoti.

== Notable people ==
Former president and prime minister of Azad Kashmir Muhammad Abdul Qayyum Khan was born in Dhirkot.
