= Sadaqat Hussain =

Pakistani politician

Member of the Provincial Assembly of Sindh
- In office 13 August 2018 – 11 August 2023
- Constituency: PS-117 (Karachi West-VI)

Personal details
- Born: Karachi, Sindh, Pakistan
- Party: MQM-P (2018-present)

Sadaqat Hussain is a Pakistani politician who had been a member of the Provincial Assembly of Sindh from August 2018 to August 2023.

== Political career ==
He was elected to the Provincial Assembly of Sindh as a candidate of Muttahida Qaumi Movement – Pakistan from Constituency PS-117 (Karachi West-VI) in the 2018 Pakistani general election.

On 26 January 2022, Hussein was beaten and arrested during a protest in Karachi.
