= Munasa =

Town in Azad Kashmir

Munnasa
- Town
- Location within Azad Kashmir
- Coordinates: 34°04′40″N 73°30′45″E
- Country: Pakistan
- Administering territory: Azad Kashmir

Area
  - Total: 5 km^{2} (1.9 sq mi)
- Elevation: 400 m (1,300 ft)
- Highest elevation: 450 m (1,480 ft)
- Lowest elevation: 250 m (820 ft)

Population
  - Total: 3,000
  - Density: 500/km^{2} (1,300/sq mi)
- Time zone: UTC+5 (PST)
- postal code: 12600

Munnasa is a town of Dhirkot Tehsil,Bagh District,Azad Kashmir, Pakistan. It is located on the bank of the Jhelum River. Munasa lies en route from Kohala to Bagh and is situated to the east of the river Jhelum; it is in an area affected by the 2005 earthquake.
