= Utility Stores Corporation =

Pakistani consumer good store chain

Utility Stores Corporation of Pakistan
- Type: Consumer Goods
- Genre: Commercial
- Predecessor: Staff Welfare Organization Stores
- Founded: 1971
- Founder: Government of Pakistan
- Defunct: 2025
- Headquarters: Islamabad, Pakistan
- Number of locations: 5,939 store outlets
- Area served: 63 regions; 9 zones
- Key people: Mr. Afzal Latif, Secretary for Industries & Production (Chairman, Board of Directors),
- Products: Wheat flour, Rice, Sugar, Biscuits; Ketchups; Toothpaste; Cooking Ghee, Spices, dates, Tea and Beverages
- Services: Supply the public consumer Items at lower prices than the open market
- Owner: Government of Pakistan
- Number of employees: 14,500
- Parent: Ministry of Industries and Production
- Website: usc.org.pk

The Utility Stores Corporation of Pakistan (USCP) was a Pakistani state-owned enterprise that operated chain stores throughout the country, providing basic commodities to the general public at prices lower than those in the open market, as they were subsidized by the government. It was the country's largest chain-store network, operating 5,939 locations before being dissolved in 2025.

Utility Stores Corporation was governed by a board of directors and headed by a managing director. Public business organizations or the public could ask the courts in Pakistan to hold hearings if they had concerns about the quality of items being sold at the stores.

== History ==
Utility Stores Corporation was established in 1971 to provide price relief on food and beverages to the low-income segment of society. It started with only 20 stores acquired from the Staff Welfare Organization. Its purpose was to supply the public, particularly the poorer sections, with clean, graded, and hygienically suitable food and non-food items free from adulteration. It also aimed to offer a setting where people could purchase items at prices lower than the general market.

During Imran Khan's tenure, the Government of Pakistan completed the computerization of the utility stores across the country to improve their performance and efficiency.

== Closure ==
The Utility Stores Corporation (USC) of Pakistan, ceased all operations on July 31, 2025. This closure followed a directive from Prime Minister Shehbaz Sharif and a decision by the USC's board of directors. The move, announced by the Ministry of Industries and Production, is part of a wider government effort to restructure state-owned companies and address significant fiscal deficits.

The USC had been grappling with substantial financial difficulties, with reported cumulative losses exceeding Rs15 billion. Following the shutdown, all sales and purchases were halted. A government committee had previously been formed to oversee the closure process and manage the fate of permanent employees, who are to be absorbed into other government departments or placed in a surplus pool.
