= KIBOR =

Pakistani Reference Rate

The Karachi Interbank Offered Rate (KIBOR) is a daily reference rate based on the interest rates at which banks offer to lend unsecured funds to other banks in the Karachi wholesale (or "interbank") money market. The banks used it as a benchmark in their lending to corporate sector.

It is also known as the benchmark rate and is published by Financial Market Association of Pakistan.

== History ==
Karachi Interbank Offered Rate (KIBOR) was first introduced in September 2001.

In February 2004, KIBOR became the benchmark rate for corporate lending in Pakistan.

== Process ==
It is quoted daily by participating banks on Reuters at 11:30 am. With 20 member banks, KIBOR rates are calculated by averaging the middle twelve rates, excluding the four highest and four lowest quotes.

== Tenors ==
- 1 week
- 2 weeks
- 1 month
- 3 months
- 6 months
- 9 months
- 1 year

== See also ==
- LIBOR
- Euribor
- Leverage (finance)
- Margin (finance)
