= Tando Jan Mohammad =

City in Sindh, Pakistan

Coordinates: 25.072°N 69.214°E

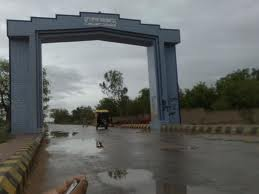
Tando Jan Muhammad, Entrance Gate.

Tando Jan Muhammad is a residential town located in Mirpur Khas District, Sindh, Pakistan.

It is situated within the Mirpur Khas District about 60 km south of Mirpur Khas city. This town was built by Mir Jan Muhammad Talpur. The population of the town in 2017 was recorded at 36,968 per 2017 Census of Pakistan, and the more recent 2023 Pakistani census recorded the population at 41,188.
