= Chamankot =

Village in Bagh, Azad Kashmir

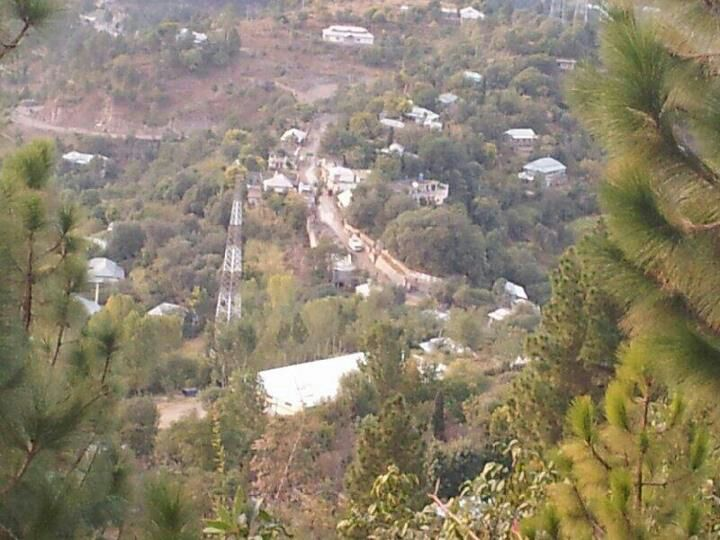
Chaman kot

Chamankot is a village in Dhirkot tehsil, Bagh District, Azad Kashmir, Pakistan. It is 15 kilometres (9.3 mi) by road above Kohala, at an altitude of 1,380 metres (4,530 ft), with the Jhelum River is at the bottom end of its sub-village, Malalbagla.

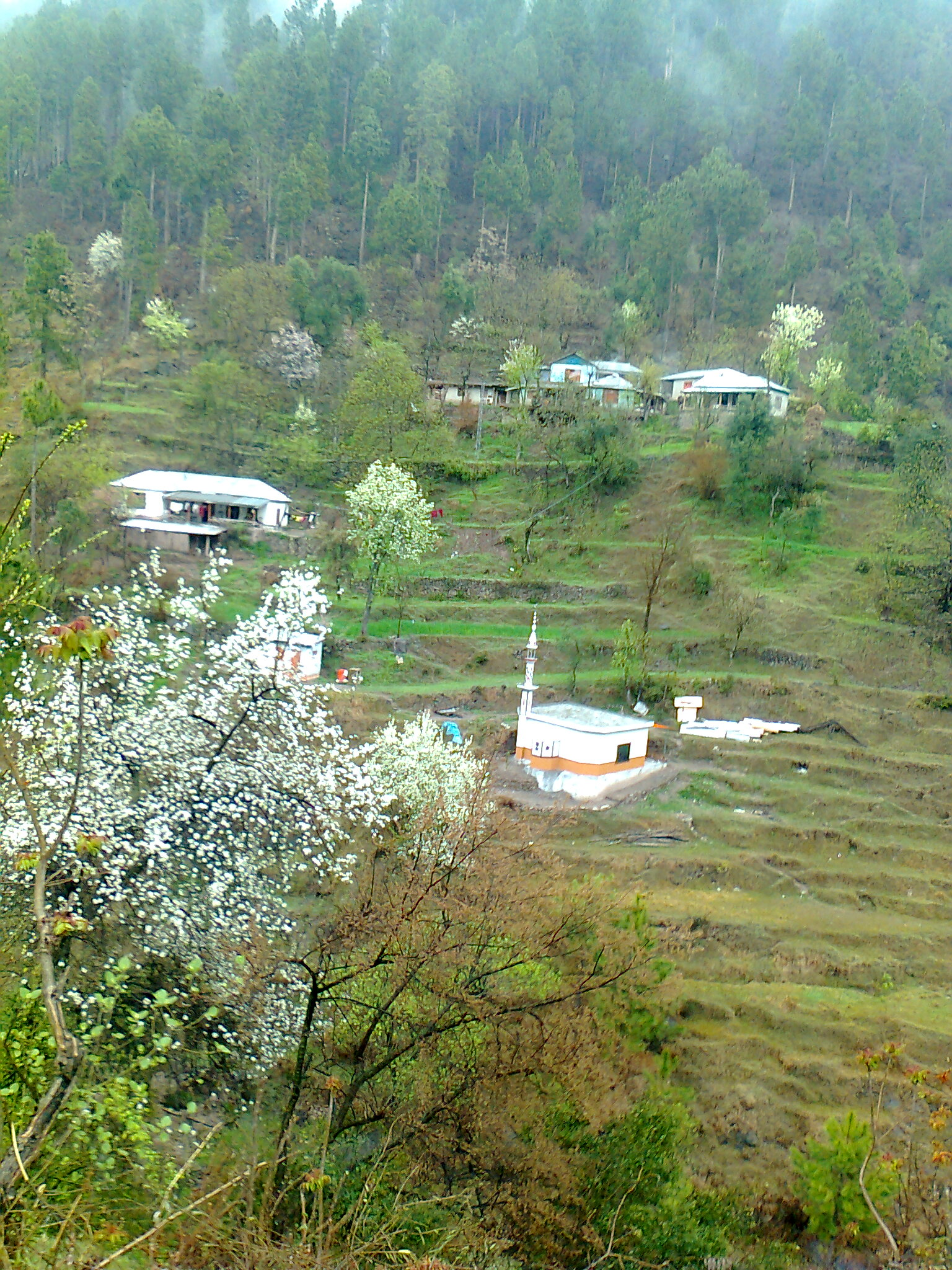
Chamayati sub village "Harola Ratti Dhari"
