= National Economic Council (Pakistan) =

Pakistani governmental institution

- ملی اقتصادی کونسل

Agency overview
- Formed: 8 June 2022
- Jurisdiction: Government of Pakistan
- Agency executive: Chairman, Prime Minister of Pakistan

The National Economic Council (NEC) in Pakistan is a constitutional entity tasked with evaluating the nation's economic state and devising strategies to promote equitable development and regional balance. Functioning within the framework of Article 156 of the Constitution of Pakistan, it plays a vital advisory role to both federal and provincial governments on matters pertaining to finance, commerce, social welfare, and economic policies.

== History ==
President Dr. Arif Alvi granted approval for the reconstitution of the NEC on 8 June 2022, in accordance with the guidelines outlined in Article 156 of the Constitution. The NEC consists of a total of 13 members, led by the Prime Minister of Pakistan, who serves as the chairman. In addition to the chief ministers from all provinces, the council includes various federal ministers and nominated representatives from different political parties and provinces.
