= Sadae Mazlomeen Dharna (Parachinar) =

2017 protest in Pakistan

Sadae Mazlomeen Dharna صدائے مظلومین دھرنا
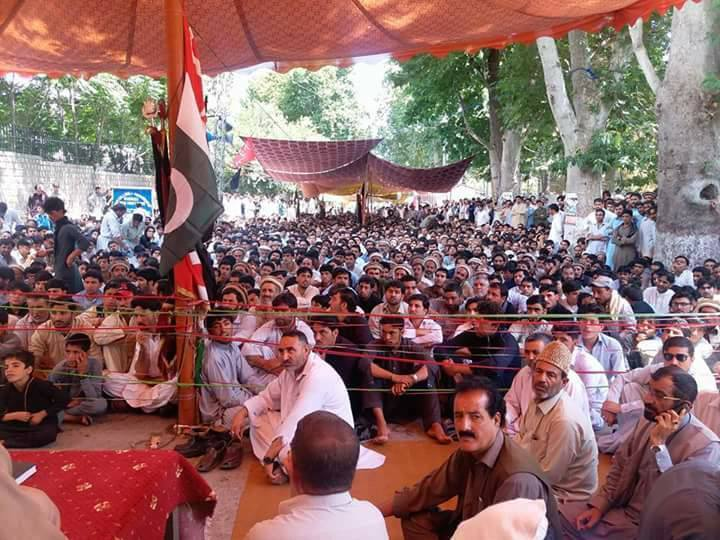
- Image of Dharna
- Date: 23 June 2017 to 30 June 2017
- Location: Khayaban-e-Inqilab Road near Shaheed Park Parachinar, Pakistan
- Caused by: frequent bomb blasts, Protesters shot and Victims' rights
- Goals: Negotiation with Army chief
- Methods: Protest, Sit-in
- Result: Totals 11 demands were presented and all were not accepted

Parties
Residents of Parachinar; Sheikh Fida Hussain Muzahiri; Allama Abid Hussain al Hussaini	Political administration Military

Lead figures
Muzammal Hussain; Shabir Sajdi; Mohsin Rasheed; Ahmed Turi	COAS General Qamar Javed Bajwa; Corps Commander Peshawar General Nazir Ahmed Butt; IGFC KP Major General Shaheen Mazhar Mahmood

Number
~10,000-20,000	

The Turi and Bangash tribes staged a sit-in protest near Shaheed Park for eight days following two explosions in Parachinar. The sit-in began after the two bombs went off on 23 June 2017 Friday evening, as shoppers were out buying supplies in preparation for the breaking of the fast on one of the last days of the holy month of Ramadan. This incident followed the callous sectarian terror attack in Parachinar. The Parachinar's sit-in was named as Sadae Mazlomeen Dharna (Voice of Victims Sit-in)

The relatives and people of Parachinar have put forth the demand that Chief of Army Staff, Interior Minister Chaudhry Nisar and other high-level officials should visit the area.

== Reason behind sit-in ==
The tribal leaders said that unlike the other areas, the injured were given only Rs 0.1 million rupees while the relatives of those martyred are given only Rs0.3 million. Protesting tribal elders have rejected the compensation offered by Prime Minister Nawaz Sharif to the families of Parachinar bombing victims, saying that they needed to be recognised as human beings first. Until the approval of demands, the protest would continue, added the protesting members of the community.

== Negotiation with Army chief ==
COAS General Qamar Javed Bajwa visited Parachinar, Kurram Agency on Friday 30 June 2017 after the two blasts on Friday 23 June 2017. On the occasion, he was briefed about the security situation in the area, according to a statement issued by Pakistan Army's public affairs department. The Army chief also held a meeting tribal elders and the heirs of those killed in Parachinar blasts.

The locals and tribal leaders expressed full confidence and trust in Pakistan Army and its leadership, saying, "We, the people of Parachinar stand behind Pakistan Army, We are Pakistanis and Muslims only. Our blood is for Pakistan."

COAS also met representatives of sit-in and listened to their concerns. After meeting with the Army Chief, the following demands were approved.

- Victims will get compensation equivalent to compensation given in Punjab. Family members of relatives will be given government jobs.
- Army Public School Parachinar is named after Maj Gulfam Shaheed and it will be upgraded to Cadet College in due course.
- Agency headquarter hospital Parachinar will be upgraded to "A" Category, however, the CoAS has decline request for CMH because Parachinar is a border area.
- Colonel Umar removed from his post.
- Firing by FC troops while handling mob situation post blast is being inquired and those responsible shall not be spared. FC commandant has already been changed. Notwithstanding the irreparable loss, four Shaheeds and injured due to firing have been given separate compensation by FC.
- While there are clear evidences of hostile foreign hands in recent incidents, local facilitators and abettors have been apprehended who will be tried in military courts.
- Additional Army troops have been moved in Parachinar to enhance its security while FC troops are being beefed up on Pak-Afg border to seal it effectively. Toori Razakars are also being dovetailed on check posts.
- Safe city project for Parachinar by installing CCTV cameras in line with the ones in Lahore and Islamabad will be undertaken.
- Fencing of border is already in progress. More sensitive areas of FATA are being fenced in Phase 1 while complete Pak-Afg border including in Baluchistan will be fenced in Phase 2.
- Trauma Centre will be established at Parachinar by Army while local civil hospital will be upgraded for better medical care by civil administration.
- Army fully supports mainstreaming of FATA which is being pursued and its early implementation is essential for enduring peace and stability.
- Govt. has now announced compensation for Parachinar victims at par with other such victims elsewhere in the country. All Pakistani's are equal.

== Solidarity ==
Majlis Wahdat-e-Muslimeen's leaders and Secretary General Allama Raja Nasir Abbas,Shia Ulema Council leaders and Pakistan Tehreek-e-Insaf Chairman Imran Khan have visited Parachinar to express his grief and solidarity with the families of victims of twin bombings on June 23, 2017. While PPP leaders Rehman Malik, Faisal Karim Kundi and media journalists, claimed that their helicopter was not allowed to land in Parachinar city.

Civil activists Jibran Nasir, Talha Rehman, Mahim Maher, Meena Gabeena, JDC Secretary General Syed Zafar Abbas and Saad Edhi (Grandson of Edhi) came from Karachi to join Parachinar sit-in. Shia Ulema from Sindh, Hangu, Kohat, Peshawar and Quetta visited Parachinar to express solidarity with families of victims and join Sadae Mazlomeen Dharna. Christian community also joins sit-in protest for solidarity with victims of twin bomb blasts.

Protests and symbolic sit-ins began in different cities of Pakistan by Majlis Wahdat-e-Muslimeen and leftist organisations to express solidarity with the victims of twin bomb blasts in Parachinar.

Symbolic sit-ins and protests in the following Cities:

Pakistan

- Islamabad
- Taxila
- Karachi
- Peshawar
- Quetta
- Lahore
- Kohat / Hangu
- Chakwal
- Sialkot
- Gilgit Baltistan
- Sobodero, Khairpur, Sukkur
- Chichawatni, Sahiwal

Other countries

- Canberra, Brisbane Australia
- London, England
- Germany
- Netherlands
- Houston (Texas), New York USA
- France
- Baghdad, Iraq
- Qom, Iran

== See also ==
- Bomb blasts in Parachinar since 2007
- Sit-in
- Long March (Pakistan)
