= PPP long march =

Pakistani anti-government protest

PPP Long March
- Date: 27 February 2022 – 8 March 2022
- Location: Karachi to Islamabad, Pakistan
- Type: Long march
- Theme: Anti-government protest
- Organized by: Pakistan Peoples Party
- Participants: Bilawal Bhutto Zardari and supporters

The PPP Long March was an anti-government long march led by Pakistan Peoples Party's Chairman Bilawal Bhutto Zardari. The march started from Mazar-e-Quaid in Karachi on Sunday, 27 February 2022 at 10 AM. The march planned to reach Islamabad in 10 days from Karachi via 34 different cities.

== March route and Timeline ==
Bilawal Bhutto Zardari approved the route plan of the march.The march planned to reach Islamabad in 10 days from Karachi through 34 different cities.

- 27 February – The march, led by Bilawal Bhutto Zardari, started from Mazar-e-Quaid in Karachi at 10 am and reached Badin via Thatta and Sujawal
- 28 February – The march ended at Moro via Hyderabad, Halla, Nawabshah.
- 1 March – The march reached Khairpur from Moro, ending in Sukkur.
- 2 March – The long march started from Sukkur and reached Rahim Yar Khan via Ghotki.
- 3 March –The march started from Rahim Yar Khan and ended at Multan via Bahawalpur, Lodhran.
- 4 March – The march reached Sahiwal from Multan via Khanewal and Chichawatni.
- 5 March – The march entered Lahore from Sahiwal via Okara and Pattoki.
- 6 March – After departing from Nasir Bagh Lahore, the march reached Sheeranwala Bagh Gujranwala and stayed in Wazirabad.
- 7 March – The march left Lala Musa for Rawalpindi, ending at Rawalpindi Liaquat Bagh.
- 8 March – The march started from Rawalpindi, with the convoy reaching the federal capital Islamabad via various routes.

== See also ==
- Huqooq-e-Sindh March
