= 2025 Azad Kashmir protests =

Protests in Pakistan

- Date: September 29, 2025 – October 4, 2025 (6 days)
- Location: Azad Jammu and Kashmir
- Result: Agreement reached between the Government of Pakistan and JKJAAC: Most demands reportedly accepted

Parties
Protesters: Jammu Kashmir Joint Awami Action Committee (JKJAAC)	Government of Pakistan; Government of Punjab; Government of Azad Kashmir

Lead figures
Shaukat Nawaz Mir; Amjad Ali Khan; Imtiaz Aslam; Hafeez Hamdani	Asif Ali Zardari; Shehbaz Sharif; Sultan Mehmood Chaudhry; Chaudhry Anwar-ul-Haq

Units involved
	Islamabad Police; Federal Constabulary; Punjab Rangers; Azad Kashmir Police

Number
Several thousand	Azad Kashmir Police (9,000); Federal Constabulary (3,000); Islamabad Police (2,000)

Casualties and losses
7 killed; 50 injured	3 killed; 172 injured

From 29 September to 4 October, the Jammu Kashmir Joint Awami Action Committee (JKJAAC) launched a region-wide shutter-down and wheel-jam strike across Azad Jammu and Kashmir (AJK), demanding structural reforms, economic concessions, and an end to elite privileges.

The protest quickly escalated into violent clashes between demonstrators and security forces, resulting in 10 deaths and over 100 injuries. The government claimed to have accepted most of the demands, while protest leaders rejected such claims and called for continued protests until full implementation.

== Background ==
The region of Azad Jammu and Kashmir (AJK), which is administered by Pakistan and often referred to as Azad Kashmir, has a history of periodic disputes over subsidies, governance, regional autonomy, and privileges granted to political elites. In May 2024, protests demanding subsidies for wheat and electricity escalated, resulting in the deaths of at least three protesters and a police officer. The government responded with promises of subsidies and reforms.

In 2025, the Jammu Kashmir Joint Public Action Committee (JKJAAC or sometimes AAC), a civil society coalition comprising traders, transporters, students, lawyers and other groups, re-emerged as a major driving force for protests in Azad Jammu and Kashmir. In late September 2025, the JKJAAC announced a regional-level strike, sometimes referred to as a "lockdown", starting on 29 September, aimed at pressing a 38-point Charter of Demands.

== Demands ==
The demands included:

- Abolition of special allowances and privileges for government officials.
- Abolition of 12 seats in the Azad Jammu and Kashmir Legislative Assembly reserved for Kashmiri migrants from Indian-administered Jammu and Kashmir.
- Royalty from hydroelectric or energy projects in Azad Jammu and Kashmir.
- Lower electricity tariffs and subsidized wheat/food assistance.
- End of elite privileges and elimination of certain reserved seats in the government structure.

== Timeline ==
=== Pre-strike phase ===
- On 27 September, Prime Minister Shahbaz Sharif publicly urged the JKJAAC to withdraw its call for an indefinite lockdown and return to talks.
- The JKJAAC maintained its plan, saying the strike would begin on 29 September.
- As preparations were underway, authorities imposed a communications blackout (internet and mobile services suspended) in parts of Azad Jammu and Kashmir from 29 September to prevent coordination of protests.

=== Strike begins ===
- On 29 September 2025, shutdown/wheel-jam strikes began in several cities of Azad Kashmir, including Muzaffarabad, Rawalakot, Kotli, Mirpur, Bhimber, etc.
- Security was tightened as major roads and entry/exit routes were sealed, and law enforcement agencies were deployed in view of the unrest.
- Rival rallies broke out in Muzaffarabad, a "peace rally" led by the Muslim Conference (a political group) clashed with JKJAAC protesters around Neelum Bridge.
- In the clash, police allegedly fired tear gas and, according to some eyewitnesses, fired live bullets. Several were injured and at least one protester (named Muhammad Sudhir) died of gunshot wounds.
- The protests spread, and more clashes broke out in other parts of Azad Jammu and Kashmir in the following days.

=== Escalation and clashes ===
- On 1-2 October 2025, several deaths were reported in clashes between JKJAAC protesters and police in Muzaffarabad on 1 October. Four people were reportedly killed and over 100 were injured in the clashes. According to a police statement, three policemen and one civilian were among the dead.
- Protest leaders rejected the government’s claims, saying that 12 of their supporters were killed and over 200 were injured.
- Across Azad Jammu and Kashmir, at least nine people have been reported dead (including police and civilians) as a result of violent protests.
- The government also announced that 172 police personnel had been injured in the protests, 12 of whom were in critical condition.
- The government appealed to citizens to refrain from violence and misinformation. It warned that legal action would be taken against those involved in violent acts.

== Casualties and injuries ==
Reports vary, but the protests resulted in casualties and property damage on both sides:

=== Killings ===
Three police officers and one civilian were killed in the Muzaffarabad clash. Protest leaders said that 12 JKJAAC supporters were killed.

Some media reports cite a total of 10 deaths in AJK (civilian + officials).

Some senior local government officials put the death toll at 15.

=== Injuries ===
Over 100 people (police and civilians) were injured in the clashes in Muzaffarabad and across the region. According to a statement from the AJK government, 172 policemen were injured, 12 of whom are in critical condition. Additional civilian injuries (reportedly ~50) have also been cited.

== Response and government reaction ==
- The Government of Azad Kashmir and federal officials said that 90 percent of the JKJAAC’s demands have already been accepted. They described the ongoing unrest as politically motivated.
- The Prime Minister of Azad Kashmir Chaudhry Anwarul Haq appealed to the JKJAAC to return to talks, warning that the violence would cost lives.
- Security measures (internet/mobile shutdowns, deployment of security forces) remained in place during the protests to limit mobilization and communication.

== Aftermath and continued developments ==
On 4 October, a peace agreement was reached, bringing an end to the protests.

The unrest sparked renewed discussions on structural reforms in the governance of Azad Kashmir, reserved seats, and the distribution of state resources.

The continued communication restrictions and the presence of law enforcement agencies have drawn criticism from civil society for restricting freedom of assembly and expression.

== See also ==
- Jammu Kashmir Joint Awami Action Committee
- 2024 Azad Kashmir protests
- 2025 Tehreek-e-Labbaik Pakistan protests
- 2026 Azad Kashmir protests
