= 2026 Azad Kashmir protests =

Ongoing protests in Pakistan-administered Kashmir

- Part of Gen Z protests in Asia
- Date: First phase: 7–27 July 2026 (23 days); Second phase: 27 July 2026–ongoing
- Location: Azad Kashmir
- Caused by: Opposition to the reservation of 12 refugee seats in the Azad Kashmir Legislative Assembly
- Goals: Abolition of refugee seats and political reforms
- Methods: Demonstrations, strikes, rallies, road blockades and marches
- Status: Ongoing

Parties
Jammu Kashmir Joint Awami Action Committee (JKJAAC)	Government of Pakistan; Pakistan Armed Forces; Government of Azad Kashmir

Lead figures
Sardar Umar Nazir Professor Naghman Arif Kampalvi Saad Ansari Adv Shoukat Nawaz Mir Khawaja Mehran Arshad Sardar Aman Khan	Syed Asim Munir Ahmed Shah

Casualties and losses
104–153 deaths; 100+ injured	Multiple killed and injured

A series of ongoing demonstrations, strikes and clashes in Pakistan-administered Azad Kashmir began on 7 June 2026. The protests are primarily organized by the Jammu Kashmir Joint Awami Action Committee (JKJAAC), which presented a 38-point charter of demands to the Government of Azad Kashmir, including its opposition of reservation of 12 seats in the Azad Kashmir Legislative Assembly for refugees from Jammu and Kashmir residing elsewhere in Pakistan. The group argues that the arrangement allows non-residents to influence the political affairs of Azad Kashmir. Multiple JKJAAC members and policemen have been killed and injured in the unrest.

The protests intensified following a ruling by the Supreme Court of Azad Kashmir on 7 June 2026, which held that the refugee seats are constitutionally protected and cannot be abolished without a constitutional amendment. Demonstrations subsequently spread across Rawalakot, Muzaffarabad, Mirpur, Kotli, Bagh and other areas.

The second phase of protests started on 27 July 2026, during the first phase of the Azad Kashmir general election. The JKJAAC boycotted the election and led a long march from Rawalakot to Muzaffarabad. Violence during the protests resulted in death of over 50 protestors, including JKJAAC's leader Sardar Umar Nazir's brother Sardar Usman Nazir.

== Background ==
The Jammu Kashmir Joint Awami Action Committee (JKJAAC or JAAC) emerged as a coalition of civil society groups, traders and activists advocating economic and political reforms in Azad Kashmir, 2023 onwards. Several protests were held addressing economic and political grievances of the locals. In May 2023, residents began protesting rising electricity tariffs alongside allegations of flour smuggling and shortages of subsidised wheat. The JAAC-led movement escalated in May 2024, when protesters undertook a long march towards Muzaffarabad, leading to violent clashes that resulted in at least five deaths.

During the protests in September–October 2025, the JAAC issued a 38-point charter of demands and called for a lockdown, after which the government imposed a communications blackout. In the negotiations that followed, the government has reportedly agreed to 35 of the 38 demands, saying that the remaining demands are either "not feasible or have court orders". In 2026, the movement focused mostly on the 12 seats reserved in the Azad Kashmir Legislative Assembly for refugees from Indian-administered Jammu and Kashmir living in Pakistan. JAAC leaders argued that the seats provide political influence to individuals who do not reside in Azad Kashmir and affect the political representation of local residents.

In May 2026, talks between a federal ministerial team and the JAAC leadership broke down with the latter finally calling for protests. Subsequently, on 5 June 2026, the local government proscribed the Committee under the Anti-Terrorism Act of 2014 and banned it.

=== Demand for abolition of the 12 refugee seats ===
One of the principal demands of the JAAC during the protests was the abolition of the 12 seats reserved in the Legislative Assembly for Kashmiri refugees and their descendants residing in Pakistan. Protest organizers argued that political representation in Azad Kashmir should be limited to residents of the territory and maintained that the reserved seats allowed non-residents to influence its political affairs. Arguments in favor of its maintenance state that it provides representation to displaced Kashmiris and is an integral part of the constitutional framework of Azad Kashmir.

=== Supreme Court ruling ===
On 7 June 2026, the Supreme Court of Azad Kashmir ruled that the twelve refugee seats are constitutionally protected and cannot be abolished without a constitutional amendment. The court further stated that elections to the Legislative Assembly should proceed within the constitutional framework.

The decision strengthened the government's position ahead of the legislative elections scheduled for 27 July 2026 but was rejected by the JAAC, which announced "a long march toward Muzaffarabad" on 15 July and promises of new demands if the current ones are not met.

=== Election schedule ===
Polling for the Legislative Assembly was scheduled in three phases. The first phase on 27 July was to be held in the Mirpur Division. The second phase on 2 August was to be held in the Muzaffarabad Division and for the refugee seats in Pakistan. The third phase on 10 August was to be held in the Poonch Division.

== Protests ==
Following the Supreme Court's decision upholding the constitutional status of the twelve legislative seats reserved for Kashmiri refugees residing in Pakistan, demonstrations intensified across Azad Jammu and Kashmir (AJK). The protests were primarily organized by the Jammu Kashmir Joint Awami Action Committee (JKJAAC or JAAC), which opposed the continuation of the refugee seats and demanded greater political representation and constitutional rights for residents of the territory.

Public rallies, road blockades, sit-ins and shutter-down strikes were reported in Muzaffarabad, Rawalakot, Mirpur, Kotli and several other towns. By mid-July, the protests had spread widely, with long marches and strikes continuing despite government crackdowns. Protest leaders argued that the refugee seats granted disproportionate political influence to individuals residing outside Azad Kashmir and called for constitutional reforms to expand local political participation. By official estimates, a least 10,000 protestors had gathered outside the city of Rawalakot.

In late July, during the elections in the Mirpur division, thousands undertook a march towards the regional capital Muzaffarabad. According to a JAAC member, five protesters were killed in the march towards the city.

On 5 November 2026, seven protestors were killed and 23 others were injured by Pakistani security forces during demonstrations organized by the JKJAAC in Rawalkot, allegedly using drones to attack civilian areas.

=== Events of 5–7 June ===
After the ban of JAAC on 5th June under the Anti-Terrorism Act of 2014, before any provocation, later that night in a raid to arrest Sardar Umar Nazir when he was returning from a gathering from Khaigala to Rawalakot, Sardar Umar Nazir's close friend Shahzaib Habib was shot dead and Sardar Umar Nazir survived a bullet that injured his left ear. Although he managed to run away. Amid the internet shutdown in the region, false rumors spread of Sardar Umar Nazir's death. Protestors went to the local hospital CMH Rawalakot to confirm where they found to a Shahzaib Habib 's dead body which lead to a massive protest from 5 June to 7 June. An FIR was filed against Shahzaib Habib declaring him a terrorist which enraged protestors.

Amid an internet shutdown across parts of Azad Kashmir, rumors circulated that Umar Nazir had been killed. Supporters gathered at the Combined Military Hospital (CMH) in Rawalakot, where Habib's body had been taken. Protests subsequently grew around the hospital and continued over the following days. Protesters also objected to the filing against Habib in connection with terrorism-related allegations.

On 7 June, clashes between protesters and security forces intensified in Rawalakot. According to BBC reporting, at least 15 people were killed, including protesters and police personnel, while more than 100 people were injured during the unrest.

=== Clashes and casualties ===
On 8 June 2026, clashes erupted between protesters and security forces in Rawalakot and surrounding areas (in Poonch Division). According to regional authorities and media, between 11 and 15 people were killed and more than 70 were injured during the unrest, including protesters and security personnel. Official figures also gave casualties at 7 people killed in Kotli and 1 killed in Mirpur. Authorities stated that some demonstrators attacked security personnel and government property, while protest organizers accused the authorities of using excessive force against largely peaceful demonstrators. JAAC leader Shaukat Nawaz Mir described the events in Rawalakot as a "massacre" and vowed to continue the protest movement despite the crackdown.

On 9 June 2026, supporters of the JKJAAC from Mirpur, Bhimber and Kotli began a march toward Rawalakot with the declared intention of later proceeding to Muzaffarabad. Protest organizers stated that participants halted outside Rawalakot at Draik on instructions from JKJAAC leadership in order to avoid direct confrontation with security forces. A large sit-in was subsequently established at Draik, while additional protest camps were organized at Mutiyalmera Bus Terminal, Mujahidabad and Paniola.

On 9 June, Mohammad Akhtar, a British national and a resident of Peterborough, was killed during his stay in Kotli when he was struck by a stray bullet when Pakistani forces opened fire at a gathering of protesters.

The sit-ins continued through much of June and July 2026 and became the main centers of protest activity in the region. Organizers repeatedly announced deadlines for further marches while simultaneously expressing willingness to negotiate with authorities.

On 29 June, a delegation of Pakistani opposition politicians led by National Assembly opposition leader Mahmood Khan Achakzai and Senate opposition leader Raja Nasir Abbas attempted to travel to Rawalakot to express solidarity with protesters and facilitate dialogue. According to media reports, police and security personnel prevented the delegation from entering the region, after which the leaders staged a brief protest before returning to Islamabad.

On 9 July, during morning hours, Pakistan Rangers raided homes in the village of Gehl Topi. A crowd had reportedly gathered to witness the raids when the force opened fire at the crowd.

On 13 July, protesters organized rallies involving students, women and children at multiple sit-in sites. Organizers stated that the events were intended to demonstrate the civilian nature of the protest movement.

On 14 July, at least 9 people were killed in clashes all over AJK: a police raid on a house near Rawalakot turned deadly when officers came under fire, killing one officer; In a separate clash in Sudhnoti district 7 protesters and a police officer were killed.

Around 24 July, Naqash Zardad, an education department employee was killed by a stray bullet when clashes erupted between police and protestors close to his farm.

On 27 July, according to JAAC, when the protesters were attempting to enter Rawalakot, the police and the state resorted to "indiscriminate... lethal force." The committee estimated that at least 9 people were killed and 15 injured. Sardar Usman Nazir, the brother of JAAC leader Sardar Umar Nazir, was among the dead. By 28 July, at least 30 people were killed: 25 people on 27 July and five more the following day. The organisation alleged that Pakistani security forces opened fire on "tens of thousands of peaceful protesters." Its spokesperson accused Pakistan's security forces of opening fire on unarmed protesters in Mirpur on 28 July before removing bodies and sealing the hospital to conceal evidence. "We have photos and videos showing bodies lying in pools of blood, but security forces took them away to erase the evidence," he alleged. Bodies of protesters reportedly disappeared from a hospital.

By the beginning of polling in the Mirpur Division, at least 40 people had been killed in the demonstrations including 34 protesters. However, Harris Qadeer, editor of the local newspaper Roznama Jeddojehad, told Drop Site News that he had documented 89 deaths in Rawalakot and Mirpur as of 28 July by collecting first-hand accounts of funerals, burials, and death records maintained by a civil society group.

On 3 August, a doctor with a makeshift clinic in Rawalakot told BBC that the clinic alone had treated around 50 to 60 critically injured patients since 27 July. He also claimed to have personally treated more than 15 victims with gunshot wounds. Most of those who have been killed or seriously injured were reportedly young people between 15-16 years of age and 32-35 years.

While the government continued to accuse JAAC of violence, Umar Nazir denied it. He stated that "certain elements" were infiltrated into the JAAC ranks. Accusing the government, Nazir stated, "I believe they may have carried out such actions themselves in order to justify their own narrative." He stated that there was "no evidence" of violence from JAAC side.

=== General strike ===
A region-wide strike called by the JAAC on 9 June resulted in the closure of markets, businesses, educational institutions and transport services across much of Azad Kashmir. Thousands of supporters participated in demonstrations despite restrictions imposed by the authorities.

Reports from Muzaffarabad and other urban centres indicated that commercial activity was largely suspended and public transport services were significantly disrupted. In response to the unrest, authorities deployed additional security personnel, detained activists associated with the protest movement and increased security measures across the region.

People in Poonch district described disruption to everyday life due to roadblocks and prolonged internet shutdowns. In Sudhnoti district, students were the most affected, alongside shortages of government-subsidised wheat caused by road closures disrupting supplies. According to a local trade association leader, the allocation for wheat in June was never fulfilled. Instead, traders were forced to buy flour at market rates. Some entrance examinations were also cancelled by the government.

Due to internet issues and blocking, many local vendors and business owners reported losses and collapse. Many banks and ATMs were rendered inoperable.

People in Rawalakot suffered from food shortages, with many protesters sharing what they had with one another while most shops remained shuttered. BBC witnessed efforts to smuggle in bags of rice on the backs of motorbikes.

== Government response ==
On 5 June, the Government of Azad Kashmir designated the JKJAAC as a proscribed organization under anti-terrorism legislation. Additionally, government authorities placed all four JKJAAC spokespeople on a wanted list, offering a reward of $36,000 for information leading to their arrests. On 30 June, prominent member of the JKJAAC Shaukat Nawaz Mir was arrested.

The government also imposed temporary internet and mobile network restrictions and increased the deployment of security personnel in various areas. On 9 June, NetBlocks stated that its data revealed that access to the web remained severely restricted in Pakistan-administered Kashmir. The internet restrictions lasted beyond hundred days and continued well into September.

Helicopter surveillance flights were set up over Rawalkot and Muzaffarabad. On 10 June, one of the military helicopters used in surveillance crashed over Muzaffarabad, killing all 22 personnel onboard.

Prime Minister of Azad Kashmir Faisal Mumtaz Rathore stated that dialogue is possible, calling the protesters for negotiations.

Pakistan Defence Minister Khawaja Asif urged "complete obedience to state." Asif later also stated that he put "the protesters of Azad Kashmir in the same category as India" and considered them also as "enemies like India." He also stated that Rawalakot is "not Kashmir" and he did not consider people from there Kashmiris.

During the clashes in late July that coincided with the elections, media were prevented from accessing the area affected by violence and the internet blackout remained in place.

The Fourth Schedule of the Anti-Terrorism Act of 2014 was invoked. On 10 August, authorities placed ten residents under the fourth schedule including two individuals from Bagh, one from Muzaffarabad, two from Poonch and one from Sudhnoti for their alleged affiliation to the JKJAAC.

=== Detentions and restrictions ===
Jamaat-e-Islami (JI) senator Mushtaq Ahmad was detained for more than 24 hours after being denied entry into the protest-affected region by security personnel. His team alleged that his detention was linked to his support for the ongoing protests.

Waqas Arif, a British national from Nottingham, was detained in Mirpur after the protests on 5 June although Arif's family claimed that he was not part of the demonstrations. According to Arif's sister, Pakistan Rangers took away her brothers in a raid. Arif's wife said that British authorities could not make direct contact with him.

=== Media blackout and ban ===
Several journalists said they were summoned to court for their reporting on the region under a law criminalizing "false and fake information." Later, new rules were introduced to restrict access for journalists beyond Pakistan's three major cities of Islamabad, Karachi, and Lahore. Additionally, the government ordered all journalists working for foreign outlets to leave the territory immediately.

Syed Farhad Ali Shah was detained on June 20 in Bagh district under the Maintenance of Public Order Ordinance for reporting on the protests. A family member stated that no FIR was filed and Shah was not made to appear in court. The Committee to Protect Journalists (CPJ) condemned his arrest. CPJ's Afghanistan-Pakistan Representative Waliullah Rahmani stated that Shah's detention "under a broad and vaguely worded preventive detention law is an attempt to silence journalists covering matters of public interest."

On 1 August, two journalists, Razi Tahir and Muhammad Saif, were seized from Islamabad and taken to an undisclosed location by individuals in police uniforms for reporting on the unrest. CPJ called for their release. Another journalist, Raja Ikram, too was detained but released later.

By 5 August, international media has also faced restrictions. New rules were introduced asking foreign journalists to seek permission to report from anywhere except the three main cities of Islamabad, Lahore and Karachi. Al Jazeera website was withheld in Pakistan after it reported on low turnout on the election in Muzaffarabad. BBC journalists were asked to "immediately leave Kashmir". Naseer Zaidi, former general secretary of the Pakistan Federal Union of Journalists, has called the restrictions unprecedented.

== Reactions ==
Amnesty International criticized the government's response, expressing concern over reports of internet shutdowns, arbitrary arrests and the use of force against protesters. Isabelle Lassée, the organisation's action regional director for south Asia, remarked on the violence and clashes in July and stated that "the disturbing reports emerging from Rawalakot" were consistent with the Pakistani authorities' "long history of unlawful violence against protesters in Jammu and Kashmir." She called for an independent and transparent investigation into the security forces' response and urged restoration of access for all communication and independent observers.

The International Federation of Journalists (IFJ), and its affiliate, the Pakistan Federal Union of Journalists (PFUJ), condemned the "enforced disappearances" of journalists including Razi Tahir, Muhammad Saif, and Raja Ikram. The PFUJ urged the authorities to fairly investigate, bring justice to the arrested journalists, and "respect freedom of speech and expression in the country." The IFJ called upon the government authorities to confirm the whereabouts of Tahir and Saif.

There were reactions from the diaspora community in the UK. On 30 July, London witnessed protests where protesters marched from Hyde Park towards the Pakistan High Commission in support of protesters in Pakistan-administered Kashmir. Sheffield Central MP met a delegation who spoke to her about how the Pakistani state was violently suppressing peaceful demonstrations and called the killing of a British national "unacceptable." The MP also raised the issue with the foreign minister Stephen Doughty.

The Rawalpindi District Bar Association announced a complete strike and court boycott in protest against the deaths of civilians and use of force in Rawalakot and Mirpur. Reacting to the clashes and casualties, Bar President Tariq Mehmood Sajid Awan said the use of force was not a solution and instead created unrest and instability. Bar Secretary Qamarul Haq Khan Niazi said the legal community stood with the people of Rawalakot and Mirpur.

The UN high commissioner for human rights, Volker Türk, urged Islamabad to launch "prompt, thorough and impartial investigations" into all civilian and security force deaths.

At a UNHRC session, First Secretary of the Permanent Mission of India to the United Nations Anupama Singh denounced the issue, accusing Pakistan of supporting terrorist groups while portraying itself as a victim and calling it a "living example of a Frankenstein state." Indian MEA too reacted to the violence coinciding with the elections. Spokesperson Randhir Jaiswal said that "the current cosmetic electoral exercise is nothing but an attempt by Pakistan to camouflage its illegal occupation and hide its grave human rights violations in the region."

Imran Hussain, Member of Parliament from UK posted on X: "Concerning reports of further unlawful killings in Azad Kashmir have emerged since the UN experts raised serious concerns over the human rights violations. There must be full accountability. The bloodshed must end, communications restored and peaceful dialogue resumed, with the inalienable human rights of Kashmiris at the heart of any resolution."

As the movement expanded, sections of Pakistan's mainstream electronic media and pro-establishment commentators tried to frame the JAAC in security-centric terms, portraying it as a potential "anti-state actor." These claims, often presented without substantive evidence, tried to shift the public discourse away from issues of governance, economic hardship, and political accountability toward narratives centred on patriotism and national security.

=== Analysis ===
Danish Khan, an associate professor at Franklin & Marshall College warned that continued harsh measures against the protesters risked validating the movement's "central argument" that Pakistan-administered Kashmir was being "treated primarily as a security problem rather than as a population with legitimate political grievances."

Kamran Bokhari, a senior analyst at the Middle East Policy Council, remarked on the restrictions on media and stated that such restrictions were "a classic case of trying to control the narrative" but it would "backfire" in the "post-social media and post-AI age."

== See also ==
- 2016–2017 Kashmir unrest
- 2024 Azad Kashmir protests
- 2025 Azad Kashmir protests
- Jammu Kashmir Joint Awami Action Committee
- List of protests in Pakistan
- List of protests in the 21st century
- Azad Kashmir Legislative Assembly
