= 2022 Karachi protests =

- Date: 26 January 2022
- Location: Karachi, Sindh, Pakistan
- Cause: Local Government Amendment Bill in Sindh
- Perpetrator: Muttahida Qaumi Movement – Pakistan (MQM-P)
- Outcome: One protester killed, several injured, MQM-P leaders and workers arrested
- Casualties: 1 protester killed, several injured
- Deaths: 1
- Injuries: Several
- Arrests: MQM leaders and workers

On 26 January 2022, members of the Muttahida Qaumi Movement staged a sit-in protest in front of the Chief Minister's House in Karachi, Pakistan, against the Local Government Amendment Bill in Sindh. The police baton-charged and shelled protest demonstrators on violation of the Red Zone, killing a protester and injuring several others.

As a result of the baton charge, several workers including a member of the Sindh Assembly, Sadaqat Hussain, were tortured and arrested. The area around the Chief Minister's House was turned into a battlefield as police and protesters clashed.

The protesters were supposed to protest outside the Karachi Press Club but suddenly the MQM leaders and workers changed their destination and reached outside the Chief Minister's House and staged a sit-in. Sindh Information Minister Saeed Ghani said that the situation was such that the police had to take action. The MQM announced to go to the press club but then they started coming to the Chief Minister's House. The incident also took place as Jamaat-e-Islami Pakistan supporters were staging demonstrations across the area.

== Reactions ==
Federal Minister Asad Umar strongly condemned the violence at the MQM protests in Karachi and said that "the dictatorial style of government of the PPP in the guise of democracy was highly reprehensible." Members of the Jamiat Ulema-e-Islam (F) movement vowed to hold protests in solidarity with the MQM.

Muttahida Qaumi Movement – Pakistan convener Khalid Maqbool Siddiqui said, "We will observe a black day against this incident and demands action against Chief Minister Murad Ali Shah".

Prime Minister Imran Khan said that he had taken notice of the violence of the police against the protesters and had demanded a report from the Ministry of Home Affairs, Chief Secretary Sindh and Inspector General of Sindh Police.
