= Jammu Kashmir Joint Awami Action Committee =

Sociopolitical organisation in Azad Kashmir

Jammu Kashmir Joint Awami Action Committee جموں کشمیر جوائنٹ عوامی ایکشن کمیٹی
- Abbreviation: JKJAAC (official); JAAC (common)
- Leader: Sardar Umar Nazir; Shaukat Nawaz Mir; Sardar Aman Khan; Khawaja Mehran Arshad; Imtiaz Aslam; Hafeez Hamdani; Raja Sohaib Javed
- Governing body: Core Committee (31 Members)
- Founded: 17 September 2023 (3 years ago)
- Banned: 5 June 2026 (5 months ago)
- Headquarters: Muzaffarabad, Azad Kashmir
- Ideology: Economic justice Social justice Populism; Anti-elitism
- Colors: Green; Red; Orange
- Slogan: Struggle for public rights

Website
- jkjaac.co

The Jammu Kashmir Joint Awami Action Committee (JKJAAC), (Note: Urdu: جموں کشمیر جوائنٹ عوامی ایکشن کمیٹی) more commonly known as the Joint Awami Action Committee (JAAC), is a sociopolitical organization based in Pakistan-administered Azad Kashmir. It has organized major protest actions against the Government of Azad Kashmir since its inception in 2023.

The JKJAAC was founded in September 2023 in Rawalakot as a civil society coalition of lawyers, students, traders and other civic groups. The group carried out small-scale protests in October and November 2023 primarily targeting the soaring price of wheat. The JKJAAC gained widespread attention when it led broad protests in 2024, resulting in 3 deaths of protestors and 1 death of a police officer. The JKJAAC led minor protests in 2025 and then massive protests in 2026, which resulted in large-scale violence. The JKJAAC was banned by the Pakistani government as a terrorist organization under the anti-terrorism act on 5 June 2026.

The JKJAAC is driven by a 38-point charter of demands, which are categorized into two main areas: immediate economic relief and long-term structural changes. Economically, the group demands significantly reduced power tariffs for Azad Kashmiri consumers, calculated based on the production cost of electricity generated from local hydro-projects like the Mangla Dam, and subsidised wheat flour prices equivalent to those offered in neighbouring Gilgit-Baltistan. Structurally, the group insists on the abolition of perks and privileges enjoyed by the political elite and bureaucracy, and the removal of 12 seats in the Legislative Assembly of Azad Kashmir that are currently reserved for Pakistan-based refugees from Indian-administered Jammu and Kashmir.

The government of Pakistan has accused the JKJAAC of torturing and killing policemen; the JKJAAC have rejected these allegations, claiming that the Pakistan Army personnel, including members of the Pakistan Rangers, were responsible for murdering protestors and civilians in Azad Kashmir.

== Formation and early activities (2022–2023) ==
The JAAC movement is driven by a comprehensive 38-point Charter of Demands. These demands are categorised into two main areas: immediate economic relief and long-term structural changes. Economically, the JAAC demands significantly reduced power tariffs for AJK consumers, calculated based on the production cost of electricity generated from local hydro-projects like the Mangla Dam, and subsidised wheat flour prices equivalent to those offered in neighbouring Gilgit-Baltistan. Structurally, the movement insists on the abolition of perks and privileges enjoyed by the political elite and bureaucracy, and the removal of 12 seats in the AJK Legislative Assembly that are currently reserved for Pakistan-based refugees from Jammu and Kashmir (union territory).

The JAAC's rise to prominence stems from its ability to unite fragmented, localised grievances over economic hardship into a coordinated, statewide political force, fundamentally challenging the political status quo. The demand for electricity at production cost moves the discourse beyond simple subsidy requests toward a constitutional debate concerning AJK's degree of political autonomy, resource ownership, and royalty from locally exploited infrastructure, implying that the AJK populace possesses inherent ownership rights over resources within its territory. The organization views its movement as a necessary response to years of perceived economic exploitation and administrative neglect perpetrated by both the AJK administration and the Federal Government of Pakistan.

Local protests over rising commodity and electricity prices began in parts of AJK in 2022 and early 2023, often led by traders’ associations and transport unions. These protests included non-payment or symbolic burning of electricity bills, localized shutter-down strikes, and sit-ins; they spread from towns such as Rawalakot to other districts as civic groups and student bodies joined the cause. Over 2023, several local committees and traders’ bodies coordinated action and — by mid-September 2023 — the movement consolidated into a broader, region-wide joint action committee that coordinated strike calls and long-march plans. Journalistic coverage and local commentaries describe the JAAC as a coalition of traders, transporters, lawyers, and student groups that became the main civil-society platform for this agitation.

Although the AJK government attempted limited reconciliation—such as withdrawing a proposed increase in electricity bills and maintaining tariffs at the July 2023 level, a decision that reportedly burdened the local exchequer by Rs10–12 billion—these measures proved insufficient to quell the widespread discontent. The public remained critical, especially in light of the more favourable subsidies provided to Gilgit-Baltistan.

The burgeoning movement gained decisive momentum in May 2023, following the launch of a sustained sit-in outside a flour depot in Supply Bazaar, Rawalakot, primarily targeting the soaring price of wheat. This localized protest served as the organizational nucleus, demonstrating the potential for civil society to organize around immediate economic pain.

Post-formation, the JAAC quickly mobilized on a massive scale. By October 10, 2023, the committee had successfully organized large rallies across AJK that included women and children. This resilience was tested but maintained even during the severe winter months. In November 2023, the JAAC staged a similar protest that ultimately ended after the AJK government provided assurances to address their concerns. However, the failure of the government to implement these promises became the direct and central trigger for the large-scale confrontations that followed in 2024.

== 2024 Azad Kashmir protests ==
In May 2024, a six-day wave of protests, sit-ins, and strikes swept AJK. What began as demands for subsidised flour and lower electricity tariffs escalated into mass demonstrations across major towns; JAAC emerged as a principal organiser and interlocutor. Recognizing the momentum, the Muzaffarabad Public Action Committees called for a "long march" toward the capital on May 11, 2024. The authorities attempted to manage the situation by declaring a two-day holiday and officially requesting paramilitary troops from Pakistan. However, the government's attempt to preempt the large planned demonstration on May 12 by arresting JAAC leaders severely inflamed the public response, resulting in deadly clashes. The confrontations between protestors and law enforcement resulted in casualties, including at least three protestors and one police officer.

On May 13, 2024, Prime Minister of Pakistan Shehbaz Sharif announced a substantial federal grant totalling Rs 23 billion (approximately $82 million) for Azad Kashmir. Following this announcement, AJK Premier Chaudhry Anwar-ul-Haq announced immediate subsidies and reduced utility rates. Following those concessions, the JAAC announced the suspension of major actions on 14 May 2024.

The concessions marked a significant victory for the JAAC. The subsidised rates implemented included:

- Wheat Flour: The price was reduced substantially from Rs 3,100 to Rs 2,000 per 40 kilograms.
- Electricity Tariffs: Prices were drastically cut for consumers, fixed at Rs3 per kilowatt-hour (kWh) for the first 100 units, Rs5 per kWh for 100–300 units, and Rs6 per kWh for consumption above 300 units.

Additionally, a judicial commission was established to review the excessive privileges enjoyed by top government officials in AJK. Later in 2024, the AJK executive promulgated the Peaceful Assembly and Public Order Ordinance, 2024, which critics said sought to restrict unregistered organisations’ ability to assemble; the measure sparked further protests and legal challenges and was subject to judicial scrutiny. Human rights and local groups reported arrests, criminal cases against participants, and continuing tensions between civil actors and the government.

== 2025 Azad Kashmir protests ==
JAAC/JKJAAC re-emerged as a mass organiser in 2025 with fresh demands and a wider charter (news outlets report multi-point charters running into dozens of items). In late September 2025, the coalition announced a region-wide lockdown/shutter-down and wheel-jam strike (a date publicised for 29 September), and leaders mobilised large rallies in Muzaffarabad, Rawalakot, Kotli, Mirpur, Bhimber and various other cities and towns.

In anticipation of the severe economic and political disruption, the Federal Government of Pakistan intervened. Prime Minister Shehbaz Sharif engaged in consultations and publicly urged the JAAC to withdraw the call, promising to contact and invite representatives for dialogue. High-level marathon talks were subsequently held, involving JAAC negotiators, the AJK government, and two federal ministers, Amir Muqam and Tariq Fazal Chaudhry. The negotiations reportedly spanned almost 13 hours. However, the dialogue ultimately collapsed, ending inconclusively due to an unbridgeable deadlock over two key structural demands.

The two demands that proved non-negotiable and led to the collapse of the talks were:

- Abolition of Elite Privileges: The insistence on eliminating the expensive perks, luxuries, and privileges enjoyed by AJK ministers, lawmakers, and bureaucrats.
- Removal of Refugee Seats: The termination of the 12 reserved seats in the AJK Assembly for Kashmiri migrants settled in Pakistan.

JAAC negotiators, led by figures like Shaukat Nawaz Mir, walked out, branding the talks as "incomplete and inconclusive" and affirming their commitment to observing the indefinite lockdown with "full force". This failure to reach an agreement confirms that while the Federation is willing to financially sustain AJK through massive subsidies, it draws a firm political line at reforms that challenge its structural influence or threaten the entrenched political patronage network.

=== State-wide strike ===
In preparation for the announced lockdown on September 29, 2025, security was severely heightened, and entry and exit points across the region were sealed. Crucially, mobile and internet services were suspended across major parts of Azad Kashmir, a measure ordered by Pakistan's Ministry of Interior. The mandated communication blackout reflects the state's recognition of the JAAC's advanced organizational capacity, confirming that the movement is viewed as a significant security threat warranting severe state intervention to impede coordination. Despite these suppressive measures, the indefinite lockdown commenced as planned.

The strike turned violent when clashes broke out at Neelum Bridge between JKJAAC activists and members of the Muslim Conference, during which gunfire by Raja Saqib Majeed and his brother left several injured and one protester, Sudheer, dead. The incident sparked larger demonstrations in Muzaffarabad and other districts, with JKJAAC leaders condemning the violence and vowing to continue protests until their demands were addressed. Authorities denied allegations of excessive force and pledged legal action against rioters, while federal officials including Amir Muqam and Tariq Fazal called for renewed dialogue.

Following the violence, JKJAAC leader Shaukat Nawaz Mir addressed nearly 5,000 people at Lal Chowk, Muzaffarabad, where he clarified that the movement held no hostility toward the Pakistan Army and would not act against it. He announced that a rally would be carried out along Neelum Road in Chehlabandi with the body of Sudheer, the protester killed in the clashes. Mir also rejected Pakistani media reports claiming that no one had joined the demonstrations, calling them fabricated attempts to portray the situation as normal. At the same time, solidarity protests were staged by the Kashmiri diaspora in London and Bradford, where Raja Amjad Ali Khan delivered a speech outside the Pakistani consulate. Meanwhile, law enforcement agencies in AJK warned protesters that if public property was damaged or normal life disrupted, stronger action would be taken. There is a call for a shutterdown strike in the state on 9th June 2026.

== 2026 Azad Kashmir protests ==
The 2026 Azad Kashmir protests were a series of demonstrations, strikes, road blockades, and violent clashes that took place across Azad Jammu and Kashmir (AJK) during June and July 2026. The movement was led primarily by the Jammu Kashmir Joint Awami Action Committee (JAAC), a grassroots coalition that had emerged during the 2024 public protests against high electricity tariffs, rising flour prices, inflation, and excessive government expenditure. Following the success of the 2024 movement, JAAC expanded its platform beyond economic grievances to include broader constitutional and political reforms.

By 2026, JAAC's principal demand had become the abolition of the 12 seats reserved in the Azad Jammu and Kashmir Legislative Assembly for Kashmiri refugees residing in Pakistan's provinces outside AJK. JAAC argued that individuals who did not reside within Azad Kashmir should not participate in electing representatives to the AJK Legislative Assembly, claiming that the reserved seats enabled political interference from mainland Pakistan and weakened the political representation of AJK residents

The political crisis reached a turning point on 7 June 2026, when the Supreme Court of Azad Jammu and Kashmir ruled that the 12 refugee seats were constitutionally protected under the 1974 Interim Constitution and could not be abolished without a formal constitutional amendment. The judgment effectively rejected JAAC's central constitutional demand and required that the upcoming legislative elections proceed under the existing constitutional framework.

Even before the Supreme Court's decision, the AJK Government had intensified its response by declaring JAAC a proscribed organization under the Anti-Terrorism Act, issuing arrest warrants against several of its leaders, announcing financial rewards for their capture, deploying additional police and federal paramilitary forces, and imposing mobile and internet shutdowns across the region. JAAC responded by announcing a long march toward Muzaffarabad and calling for mass public demonstrations against the government's actions.

On 8 June 2026, violent clashes erupted in Rawalakot and several other areas between protesters and security forces. Demonstrators established roadblocks, organized strikes, and blocked major highways, while authorities launched large-scale security operations to restore order. JAAC alleged that security forces used excessive force against unarmed protesters, whereas government officials maintained that armed demonstrators had attacked police personnel and public institutions. According to international media reports, at least eleven people were killed and dozens injured during the initial phase of the unrest, with the majority of casualties reported from Rawalakot in Poonch District.

On 9 June 2026, JAAC organized a region-wide shutdown strike that brought commercial activity, transportation services, educational institutions, and markets to a standstill across Muzaffarabad, Poonch, Bagh, Kotli, Mirpur, and surrounding districts. The government responded by increasing security deployments, expanding restrictions on movement, and continuing arrests of JAAC activists and leadership. Pakistani authorities accused JKJAAC protestors of torturing and murdering policemen.

The unrest escalated further during July 2026 as the government proceeded with phased elections for the AJK Legislative Assembly. JAAC rejected the electoral process and called for a complete boycott, arguing that elections conducted under the existing constitutional framework could not represent the will of the people of Azad Kashmir. Additional clashes occurred on 14 July 2026 during security operations in Poonch and Sudhnoti, further increasing tensions throughout the territory.

The most significant confrontation occurred on 27 July 2026, during the first phase of Azad Kashmiri election, when thousands of JAAC supporters attempted to march during polling in the Mirpur Division. Security forces responded with live ammunition and other forceful measures, resulting in one of the deadliest incidents of the entire protest movement. Pakistani officials accused the JKJAAC of having a "foreign agenda" and being backed by India.

According to records released by the Jammu Kashmir Joint Awami Action Committee (JAAC), 31 individuals lost their lives during the events of 27–28 July 2026, with the overwhelming majority of fatalities occurring in Rawalakot. JAAC commemorates these individuals as the martyrs (Shuhada) of the July 2026 movement, while government authorities disputed both the reported casualty figures and the circumstances surrounding the deaths.

Beyond the loss of life, the protests produced a severe humanitarian and economic crisis across Azad Kashmir. Prolonged internet and mobile communication shutdowns disrupted banking services, education, healthcare, emergency communications, and commercial activity. Road blockades interrupted the supply of food, fuel, medicines, and other essential goods, while hospitals experienced difficulties transporting patients and receiving medical supplies. Businesses suffered substantial financial losses, students faced examination delays, and everyday life throughout the region was significantly disrupted.

The Government of Azad Jammu and Kashmir defended its actions as necessary to preserve public order, enforce the Supreme Court's ruling, and protect constitutional institutions. Officials argued that security operations were conducted in response to violent attacks on law enforcement personnel and public infrastructure.

Human rights organizations, including Amnesty International, expressed concern regarding the use of excessive force against protesters, the banning of JAAC, arrests of political activists, prolonged communication blackouts, and restrictions on freedom of assembly. International media outlets extensively covered the unrest, while the situation was also discussed in the United Kingdom Parliament following concerns raised by members of the British Kashmiri diaspora. Political analysts have since described the 2026 Azad Kashmir protests as one of the most significant episodes of civil unrest in the history of Azad Jammu and Kashmir, reflecting deep tensions over governance, constitutional representation, economic inequality, and political autonomy.
