= List of cultural heritage sites in Azad Kashmir =

Cultural heritage sites in Azad Kashmir

Azad Jammu and Kashmir, part of the former British princely state of Jammu and Kashmir, is an autonomous state of Pakistan. The history of the region dates back to thousands of years. A survey team in 2014 recorded around 100 archaeological sites in the region dating back to Mughal, Sikh, and Dogra rule.

== List ==
Following is an incomplete list of cultural heritage sites in Azad Kashmir, Pakistan.

ID	Name	Type	Location	District	Coordinates	Image
AJK-1	Bagh Fort	Fort	In the town of Bagh	Bagh District		Bagh Fort More images Upload Photo
AJK-2	Baghsar Fort	Fort	Near the town of Baghsar	Bhimber District	33°02′22″N 74°12′23″E	Baghsar Fort More images Upload Photo
AJK-3	Mughal Mosque	Mosque	In the town on Bhimber	Bhimber		Mughal Mosque More images Upload Photo
AJK-4	Haathi gate (Mughal Elephant gate)	Historical site	Near purani kacheri in the town on Bhimber	Bhimber		Upload Photo Upload Photo
AJK-5	Sarai Saadabad	Historical site	Samahni	Bhimber		Sarai Saadabad More images Upload Photo
AJK-6	Darbar Baba Shadi Shaheed	Shrine	In Jandi Chontra	Bhimber	33°03′03″N 74°06′55″E	Darbar Baba Shadi Shaheed More images Upload Photo
AJK-7	Ali Baig Gurdwara	Gurdwara	In the village of Ali Baig near Khalsa Middle School	Bhimber	33°00′39″N 73°52′10″E	Ali Baig Gurdwara More images Upload Photo
AJK-8	Darbar Haji Pir	Shrine	Located near Aliabad	Haveli District		Upload Photo Upload Photo
AJK-9	Throchi Fort	Fort	Located in Gulpur at end of Gulpur-Throchi Road on top of the hill	Kotli District	33°25′43″N 73°52′36″E	Throchi Fort More images Upload Photo
AJK-10	Bhrund Fort	Fort	Located in Sehnsa	Kotli		Upload Photo Upload Photo
AJK-11	Darbar Mai Toti Sahiba	Shrine	In Pandli Sharif, 4 kilometres (2.5 mi) from Khuiratta	Kotli		Darbar Mai Toti Sahiba More images Upload Photo
AJK-12	Fountains and gardens at Khuiratta	Historical site	In the town of Khuiratta38 kilometres (24 mi) from Kotli city	Kotli		Upload Photo Upload Photo
AJK-13	Ramkot Fort	Fort	Across the Mangla lake from Sukhian (travel via boat)	Mirpur District	33°13′25″N 73°38′30″E	Ramkot Fort More images Upload Photo
AJK-14	Shrines of Khari Shareef	Shrine	located 8 kilometres (5.0 mi) south of Mirpur city on Darbaar Road	Mirpur	33°05′03″N 73°45′38″E	Shrines of Khari Shareef More images Upload Photo
AJK-15	Mangla Fort	Fort	Next to Mangla Dam (possibly off-limits)	Mirpur	33°07′53″N 73°38′26″E	Mangla Fort More images Upload Photo
AJK-16	Burjun Fort	Fort	In Burjun,	Mirpur		Burjun Fort More images Upload Photo
AJK-17	Pir Chinasi (Pir Shah Hussain Bukhari's shrine)	Shrine	At the end of Pir Chinasi Road	Muzaffarabad District	34°23′20″N 73°32′59″E	Pir Chinasi (Pir Shah Hussain Bukhari's shrine) More images Upload Photo
AJK-18	Red Fort (Muzaffarabad Fort, Rutta Qila, Chak Fort)	Fort	In Muzaffarabad city, near Challah Bridge on Neelam Road	Muzaffarabad	34°22′56″N 73°27′53″E	Red Fort (Muzaffarabad Fort, Rutta Qila, Chak Fort) More images Upload Photo
AJK-19	Black Fort (Gojra Fort)	Fort	Police Line Road, in Muzaffarabad city. Currently used as a cantonment by Pakistan Army. Off limits to public.	Muzaffarabad	34°21′35″N 73°28′00″E	Upload Photo Upload Photo
AJK-20	Kohala Bridge	Historical site	On Kohala-Muzaffarabad Road	Muzaffarabad	34°05′46″N 73°29′55″E	Kohala Bridge More images Upload Photo
AJK-21	Quaid-e-Azam tourist lodge, Barsala	Historical site	On Kohala-Muzaffarabad Road 3 kilometres (1.9 mi) from Kohala Bridge on the way to Muzaffarabad	Muzaffarabad	34°07′48″N 73°29′49″E	Quaid-e-Azam tourist lodge, Barsala More images Upload Photo
AJK-22	Sain Saheli Sarkar Darbar	Shrine	in District Headquarter office complex, Muzaffarabad	Muzaffarabad	34°21′29″N 73°28′26″E	Sain Saheli Sarkar Darbar More images Upload Photo
AJK-23	Sharda Peeth	Ruins, Archaeological site	Located in the town of Sharda near the Main Bazaar	Neelum Valley	34°47′32″N 74°11′24″E	Sharda Peeth More images Upload Photo
AJK-25	Baral Fort	Fort	12 miles (19 km) south of Pallandri in the town of Baral	Sudhanoti District	33°38′14″N 73°42′14″E	Baral Fort More images Upload Photo
AJK-26	Rani Bowli (Pallandri bowli)	Historical site	On outskirts of Pallandri town	Sudhanoti		Rani Bowli (Pallandri bowli) More images Upload Photo
AJK-27	Bharand Fort	Fort				Bharand Fort More images Upload Photo
AJK-28	Aion Fort	Fort				Upload Photo Upload Photo
AJK-29	Ranbir Singh Baradari	Historical site	Domel Bridge, Muzaffarabad	Muzaffarabad		Ranbir Singh Baradari More images Upload Photo
AJK-30	Karjai Fort (khui ratta)	Historical site	On Karjai mountain khuiratta kotli	Kotli		Upload Photo Upload Photo
AJK-31	Nerian Sharif	Historical site and shrine		Sudhanoti	73°46′20″N 33°45′06″E	Upload Photo Upload Photo
AJK-32	Sri Dheri Gurdwara	Historical ruins of a Gurdwara	3 km from downtown Rawalakot	Poonch		Upload Photo Upload Photo
