= Kot Jattan =

Village in Azad Kashmir, Pakistan

Coordinates: 31°08′N 73°53′E

Kot Jattan, is a village in U-C Dhandar Kashmir Pakistan, in the foothills of the Himalayas in district and tehsil Bhimber. It has almost 500 houses with a population of a few thousand.

== Location ==
Kot Jattan is at the southern edge of Azad Kashmir bordering Punjab, Pakistan on the Bhimber-Barnala Road about 12 km. from Bhimber, 15 km. from Barnala (Tehsil of Bhimber) and 8 km. from Kotla Arab Ali Khan.

It is surrounded by the villages of Nandwal in Gujrat District to the southwest, Kot Chibban (its twin village) to the east and Dhandar to the northeast.

== Climate ==
The climate is mild, and generally warm and temperate, with summers that are rainier than the winters. The location is classified as Cwa in the Köppen climate classification. The average annual temperature in Kot Jattan is 23.7 °C. About 947 mm of precipitation falls annually. Precipitation is the lowest in November, with an average of 11 mm. The greatest amount of precipitation occurs in August, with an average of 268 mm. At an average temperature of 33.5 °C, June is the hottest month of the year. The lowest average temperatures in the year occur in January, when it is around 12.2 °C.

== History ==
The town and a nearby castle were burned down in 960 AD by the Maharaja of Kashmir after the local governor ended his allegiance to the Maharaja in Sirinagar.
