= List of hotels in Pakistan =

This is a list of hotels in Pakistan, listed separately for four of its provinces, territories and other administrative units of Pakistan. The list is not a directory of every chain or independent hotel building in Pakistan.

== Gilgit-Baltistan and Azad Kashmir ==
- Khaplu Palace, Khaplu, Baltistan
- Quaid-e-Azam tourist lodge, Barsala

== Islamabad Capital Territory ==
- The Centaurus

== Khyber Pakhtunkhwa ==
- Khan Klub, Peshawar

== Punjab ==
- Faletti's Hotel, Lahore
- Pearl Continental Bhurban, near Murree resort town

== Sindh ==
- Crescent Bay, Karachi

== Nationwide chains ==
- Avari Hotels
- Pearl Continental
- Serena Hotels

== See also ==
- Lists of hotels – an index of hotel list articles on Wikipedia
