= Jandi Chontra =

Jandi Chontra is a town in the Bhimber District of Pakistani-administered Jammu and Kashmir. It is a local tourist spot and is located 17 km from Bhimber city and 67 km from Mirpur. The area is known for its panoramic views. The Shrine of the Sufi saint Sheikh Baba Shadi Shaheed is also located here.
