= Kotli Gujjran =

Kotli Gujjran کوٹلی گُجراں
- Village
- Interactive map of Kotli Gujjran
- Coordinates: 33°11′19″N 74°03′05″E
- Country: Pakistan
- Territory: Azad Kashmir
- Division: Mirpur
- District: Bhimber
- Tehsil: Samahni
- Thana: Chowki
- Union Council: Khambah
- Time zone: UTC+5 (PST)

Kotli Gujjran is a village in Samahni, Bhimber District, Azad Kashmir, Pakistan.

== Geography ==
Kotli Gujjran is situated in the Samahni Tehsil. The village is approximately 25 kilometers southwest of Jandala (Samahni Valley) and around 64 km away from Administration unit Bhimber.

== Demographic and language ==
The population of Kotli Gujjran is predominantly composed of ethnic Gujjars, a community known for their pastoral lifestyle and cultural traditions. The primary languages spoken in the village are Punjabi and Pahari-Pothwari, with Urdu serving as the official language.
