= Jandala, Samahni =

Village in Azad Kashmir, Pakistan

Coordinates: 33°8′30″N 73°59′37″E

Jandala is a village in the Samahni Valley in the Bhimber District of Azad Kashmir, in Pakistan, about 6–7 km from Bindi. Nearby villages include Darhal, Kotli Gujjran, Barjun and Garhoon on the mountain, and Chadroon on the valley floor between Bindi and Jandala. The village is an employment hub for the area.

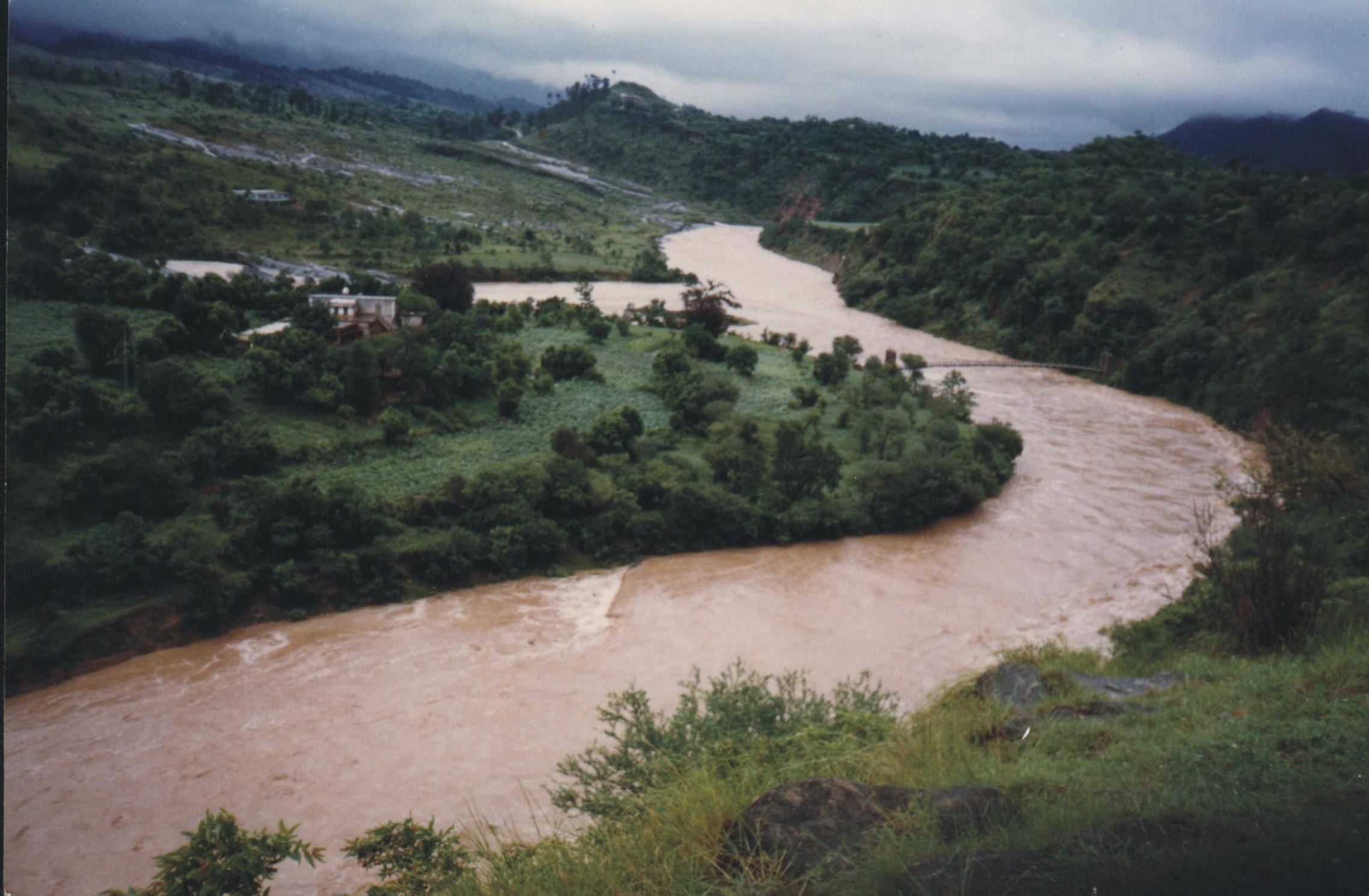
Jandala, Samahni Valley, Azad Kashmir

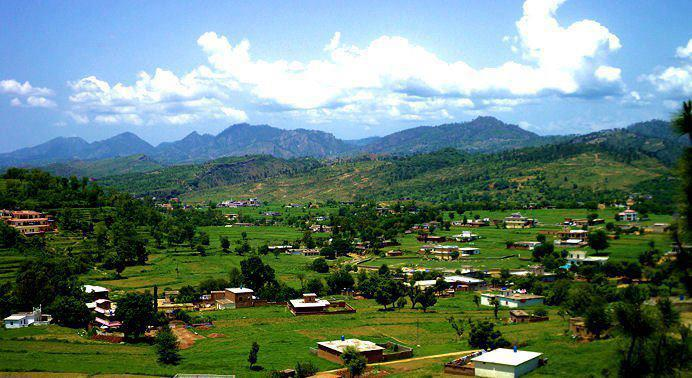
Khunna, Jandala, Samahni, AJK

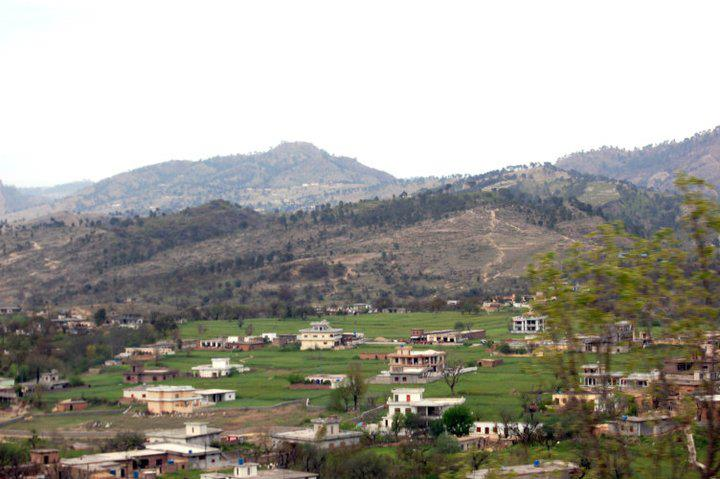
Front view of Jandala, Samahni, AJK

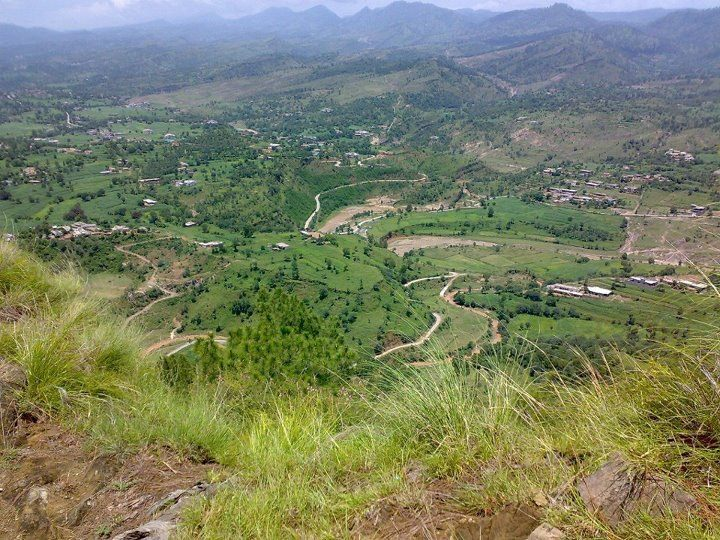
Top view of Jandala

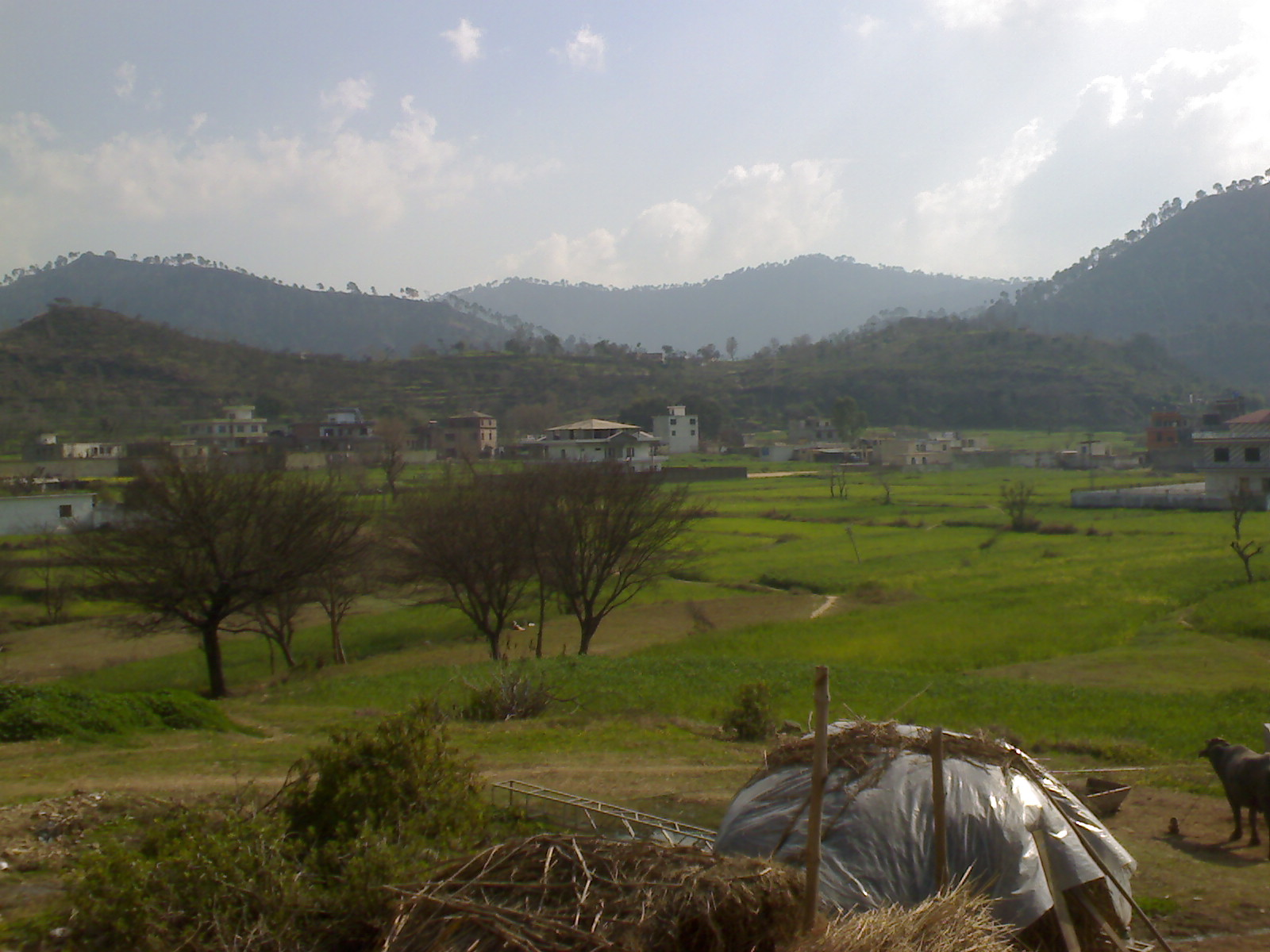
Jandala (Samahni Valley)

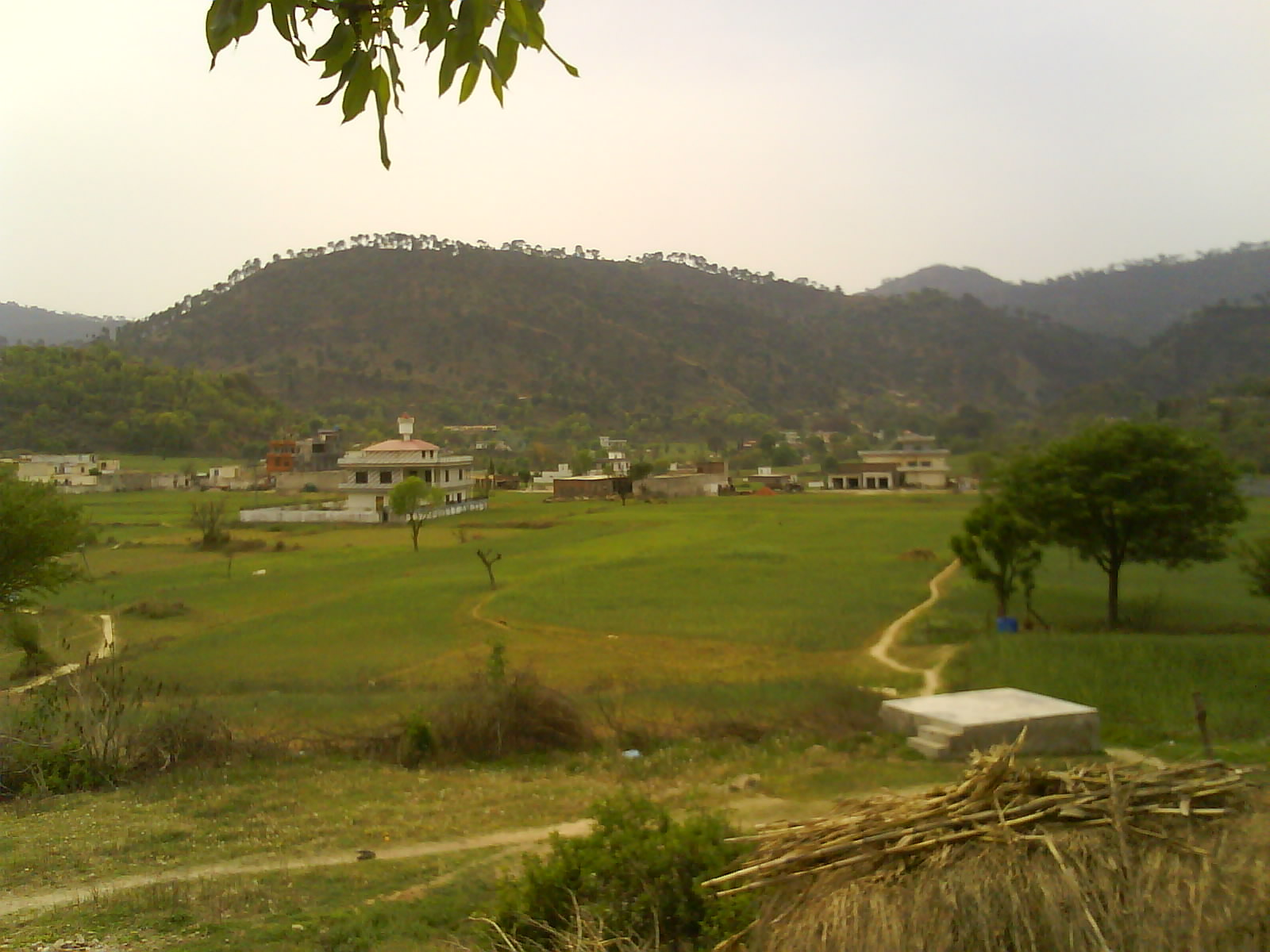
Jandala (Samahni Valley) AJK

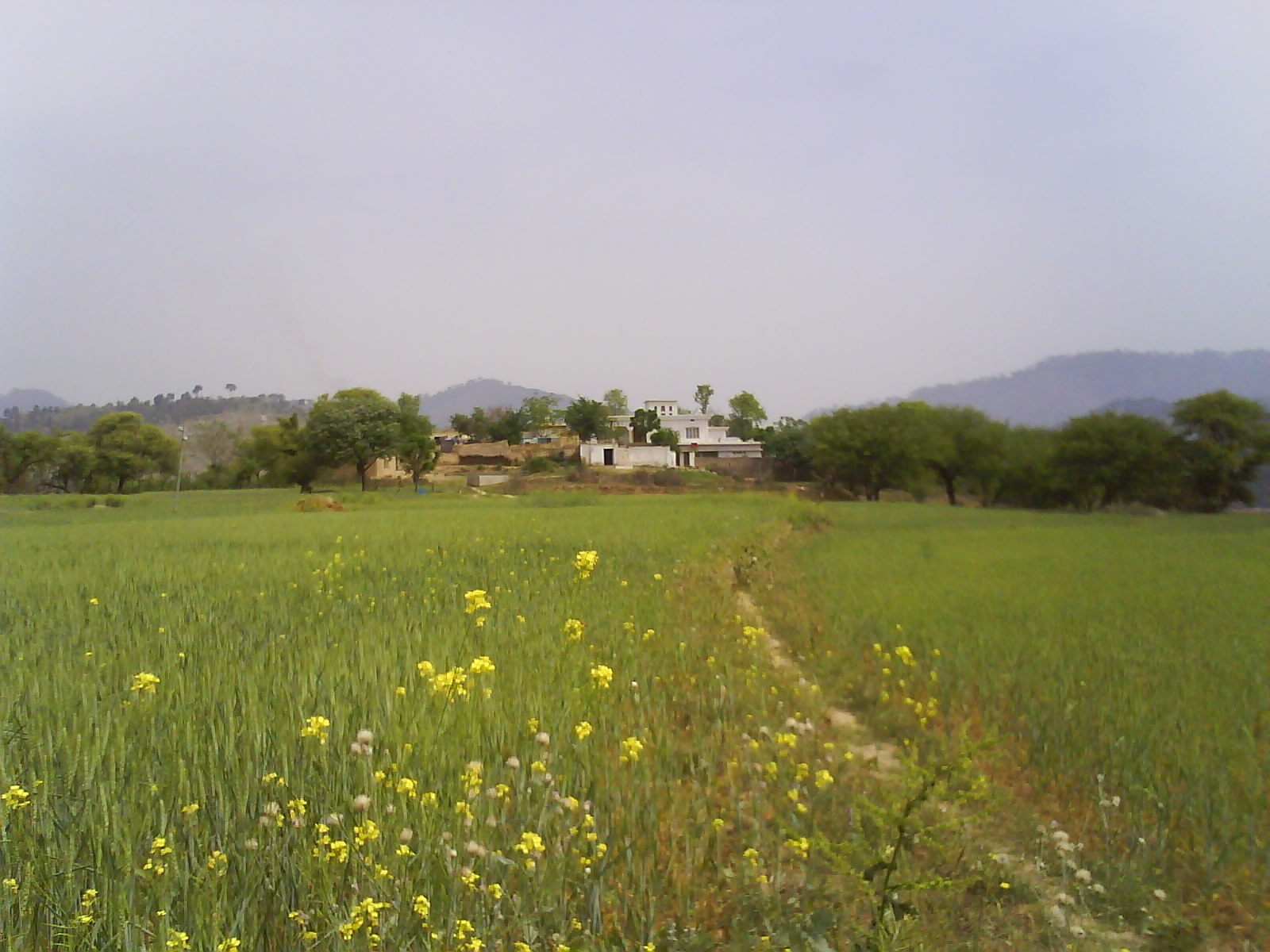
Jandala (Samahni Valley) AJK
