= Remittances to Azad Kashmir =

Remittances to Azad Kashmir are money transfers from Azad Kashmiri diaspora employed outside the territory to family, friends or relatives residing in Azad Kashmir.
