= General Vance =

General Vance may refer to:

- Jack Vance (general) (1933–2013), Canadian Army lieutenant general
- Jamil Rahmat Vance (fl. 2010s), Pakistan Army major general
- Jonathan Vance (born 1964), Canadian Army general
- Joseph Vance (Ohio politician) (1786–1852), Ohio State Militia major general
- Robert B. Vance (1828–1899), Confederate States Army brigadier general
