= Mirpur University of Science & Technology =

University in Mirpur, Azad Kashmir

Mirpur University of Science and Technology, Mirpur, Azad Kashmir
- Motto: Wisdom and Virtue!
- Type: Public
- Established: 2008
- Affiliations: Pakistan Engineering Council; Higher Education Commission of Pakistan
- Chancellor: President of Azad Kashmir
- Vice-Chancellor: Dr. Muhammad Younus Javed, SI(M)
- Location: Mirpur, Azad Jammu & Kashmir, Pakistan
- Mascot: Mustian
- Website: www.must.edu.pk

Mirpur University of Science & Technology ( جامعۂ علم و فن آوری ، میرپور) was formerly a constituent college of University of Azad Jammu and Kashmir as University College of Engineering & Technology Mirpur. It is a state university.

As of 2024, the university had produced 17,893 graduates, including 16,383 with BS degrees, 1,538 with MS/MPhil degrees, and 38 with PhDs across 42 departments. It offers 84 degree programs under five faculties and enrolled 8,679 on-campus students (6,959 undergraduate, 1,617 MS, and 103 PhD students), as well as 3,260 students in affiliated colleges.

== Recognized university ==
This university is recognized by the Higher Education Commission of Pakistan.

== History ==
The main campus of the university is situated on Allama Iqbal Road, Mirpur, Azad Kashmir and the Bhimber Campus is in District Bhimber (33°9′0.72″N 73°44′41.53″E).

The second campus is located on Allama Iqbal Road adjacent to Girls Degree College.

== Campuses ==
- Main campus (Mirpur)
- Bhimber Campus
- Pallandri Campus (District Sudhanoti)
- Jari Kas Campus
- Nazara Campus

== See also ==
- List of institutions of higher education in Azad Kashmir
