= Manzoor Mirza =

Pakistani economist (1930–2016)

- منظور مرزا
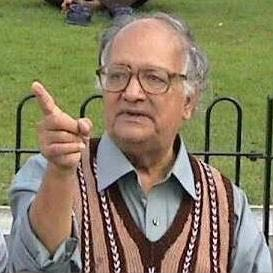
- Professor Manzoor Mirza in 2005

Personal details
- Born: 13 August 1930 Bhimber, British India
- Died: 28 March 2016 (aged 85) Lahore, Punjab
- Education: University of the Punjab, Lahore; Murray College, Sialkot

Manzoor Mirza (13 August 1930 – 28 March 2016) was a Pakistani educationist who also was an Additional Secretary of Education, and Professor of Economics.

He authored many books on English and economics, as well as writing several book reviews.

== Early life and education ==
Born and raised in Bhimber, Azad Jammu and Kashmir, he passed matriculation exam after attending Bhimber High School. Manzoor Mirza graduated with honours in English Literature from Murray College Sialkot and went to University of the Punjab Lahore for his master's degree in Economics. He received his master's degree in 1952.

== Career ==
After finishing his college education, he started teaching Economics as a lecturer. Then he became the founding principal of Government College for Boys in Phalia, Mandi Bahauddin District, Punjab (Pakistan). For some time, he served as a director of colleges, Multan Division. Later, he was sent on deputation to a university in Kampala, Uganda as associate professor of Economics. In 1989, he represented Pakistan in a South Asian Association for Regional Cooperation (SAARC) conference held in India.

He also served as a panelist at the Civil Services Academy Lahore in Punjab, Pakistan as well as a guest speaker at National Institute of Public Administration (NIPA).

=== Columnist ===
Manzoor Mirza was a regular newspaper columnist at many English-language newspapers in Pakistan until 2001.

== Books and contributions ==
- Selective Long Essays
- Sundry Reflections
- Paragraphs and Essays
- Special Reflective Essays
- Text Book of Development Economics
- Writing Practice for IELTS Test
- Pool of Topics
- Writing Topics for TOFEL and other Competitive Exams

== Death ==
Manzoor Mirza died peacefully on 28 March 2016 at the age of 85 in Lahore.
