= Krishan Dev Sethi =

Kashmiri activist (1928–2021)

- Born: 1 January 1928; Mirpur, Jammu and Kashmir, British India
- Died: 28 January 2021 (aged 93); Jammu, Jammu and Kashmir, India
- Occupation: Political Leader

Krishan Dev Sethi (1 January 1928 – 28 January 2021) was the General secretary of Democratic Conference Jammu and Kashmir and was the last member of J&K's constituent assembly.

Krishan Dev Sethi was born to a Hindu Brahmin family in Mirpur. Sethi was not only a well known leader in Jammu, where he resided but also very popular across the LOC in Azad Jammu & Kashmir. He was an ardent supporter of an independent Kashmir and fought for independence since the 1950s.

== Death ==
Sethi died at his Jammu residence on 28 January 2021. He was the last surviving member of constituent assembly of Jammu and Kashmir.
