= Dhandar =

Place in Bhimber, Azad Kashmir

Coordinates: 32°54′38″N 74°07′26″E

Dhandar is a union council and a small town in Bhimber tehsil, Bhimber District, Azad Kashmir, Pakistan.
