= Alibeg =

Alibeg علی بیگ
- Ali Baig
- Location within Azad Kashmir Location within Pakistan Location within Kashmir
- Coordinates: 33.0119°N 73.8665°E
- Country: Pakistan
- Territory: Azad Kashmir
- District: Bhimber District
- Time zone: UTC+5 (PST)

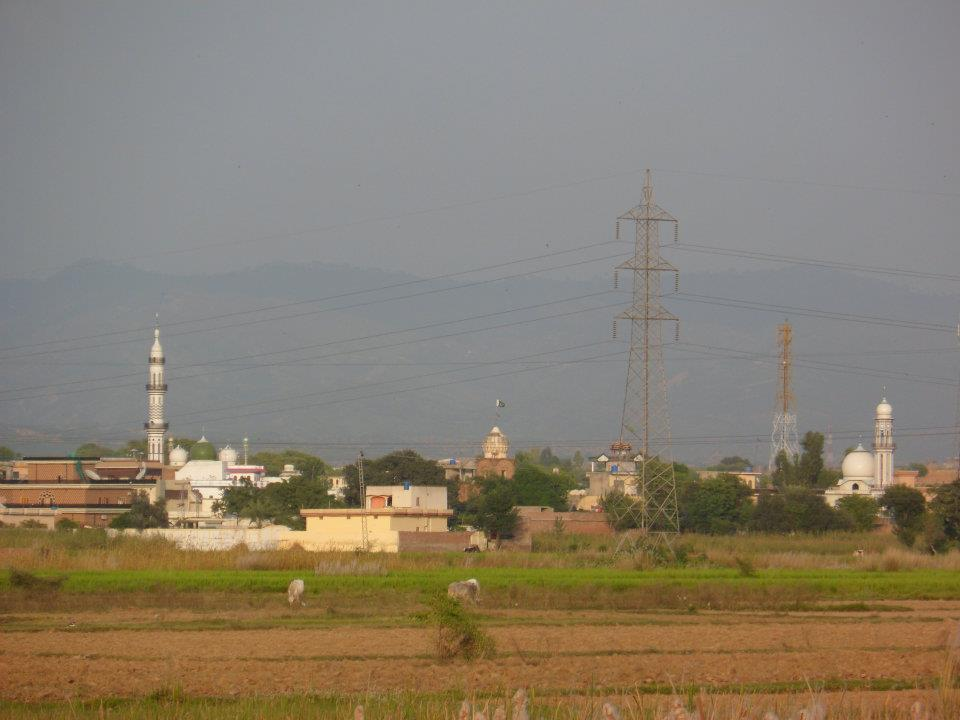
Mirza Ali Beg Azad Kashmir

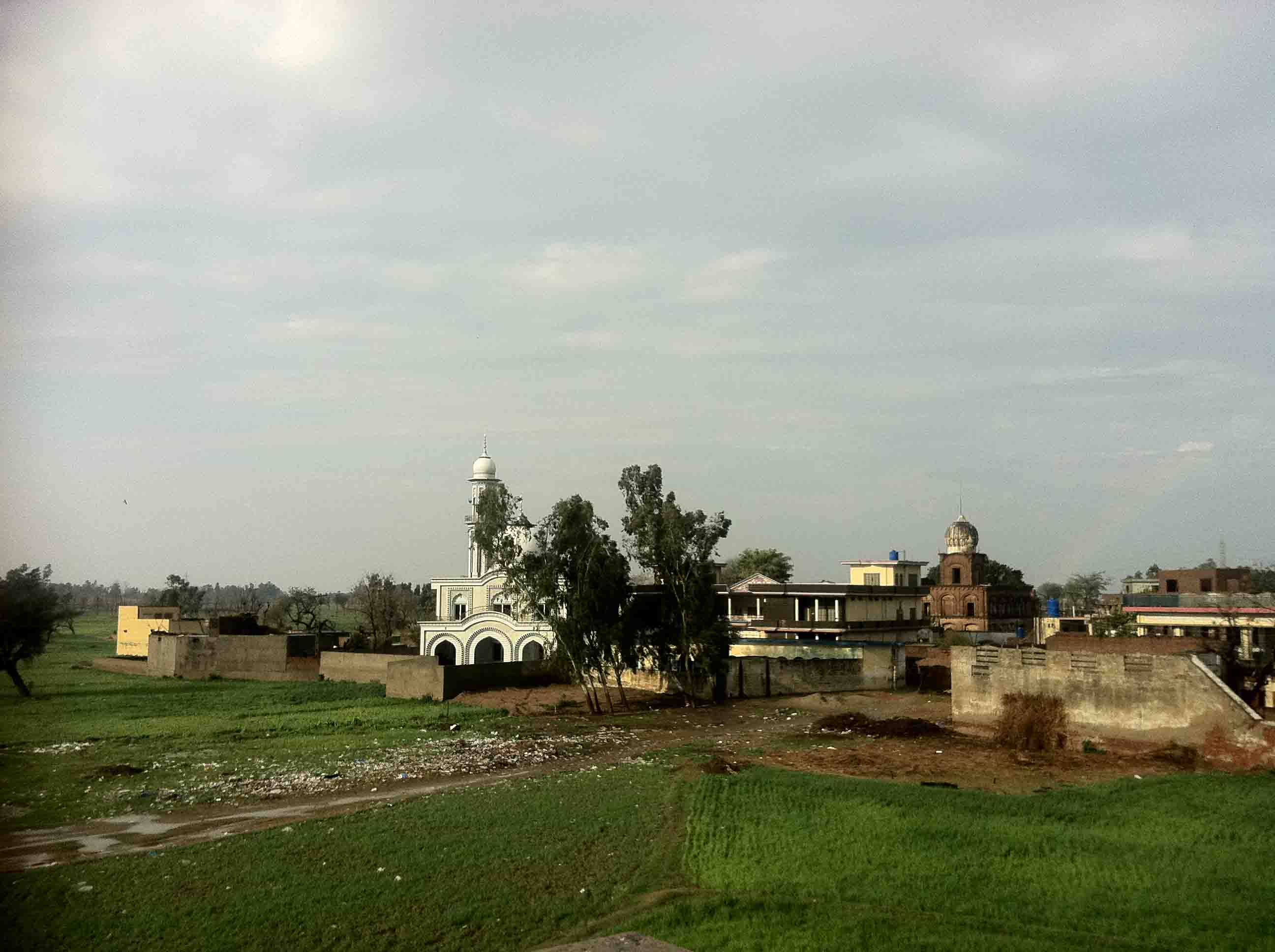
Jamia Masjid Milad Un Nabi Mirza Ali Beg Arain

Alibeg, also spelt Ali Beg or Ali Baig (علی بیگ), previously called Kirtan Ghar (کیتن گھڑ/ਕੀਰਤਨਗੜ), is a village in the Bhimber District of Azad Kashmir, Pakistan. It is on the bank of the Upper Jhelum Canal. It is the seventh-largest village of Azad Kashmir with a population of almost five thousand people. Most of the people are educated in the village.

== History ==
The village was earlier known as Kirtan Ghar under the name of a Sikh gurudwara in the area. There was also a Khalsa Middle School (خالصہ مڈل سکول/ਖਾਲਸਾ ਮੀਡਲ ਸਕੂਲ), which was mainly run by Sant Baba Sunder Singh Ji. students from nearby villages such as Dina, Gora Nakka, Kalri, Kamotra, Jhelum, Kotla, Chachiya etc. came to seek knowledge. And the languages taught in the school were Persian, Urdu, Punjabi, English etc. Before the partition of 1947, the main communities that lived there are Muslims, Sikhs and Hindus and they engaged in agriculture and pastoralism. Presently, Arain Families populate the Ali Baig village.

== Economy ==
People in the village grow wheat, maize, barley, pulses, sugarcane and other vegetables.

Alibeg has several private schools.

Notable people include: Ch. Muhammed Sarwar Mehar. (Retired Superintendent of Asad Kashmir Courts.)

== Demographics ==
The native language is Pothwari.

== Bibliography ==
- Vaid, S. P. (2006), Socio-Economic Roots of Unrest in Jammu & Kashmir, Jammu: Shyama Publications – via archive.org
