= Mirpur Development Authority =

Public corporation in AJK

- Founded: 1974
- Type: Public benefit
- Location: Mirpur District
- Website: www.mdamirpur.gok.pk

Mirpur Development Authority, located in sector F/2, is a public benefit corporation responsible for providing municipal services in Mirpur city, Azad Jammu & Kashmir's largest city. MDA was established through MDA ordinance in 1974. The authority is the successor of the Allotment Of The Land Committee which was created in 1964.
