= Ramkot Fort =

Late medieval fort in Mirpur, Azad Kashmir

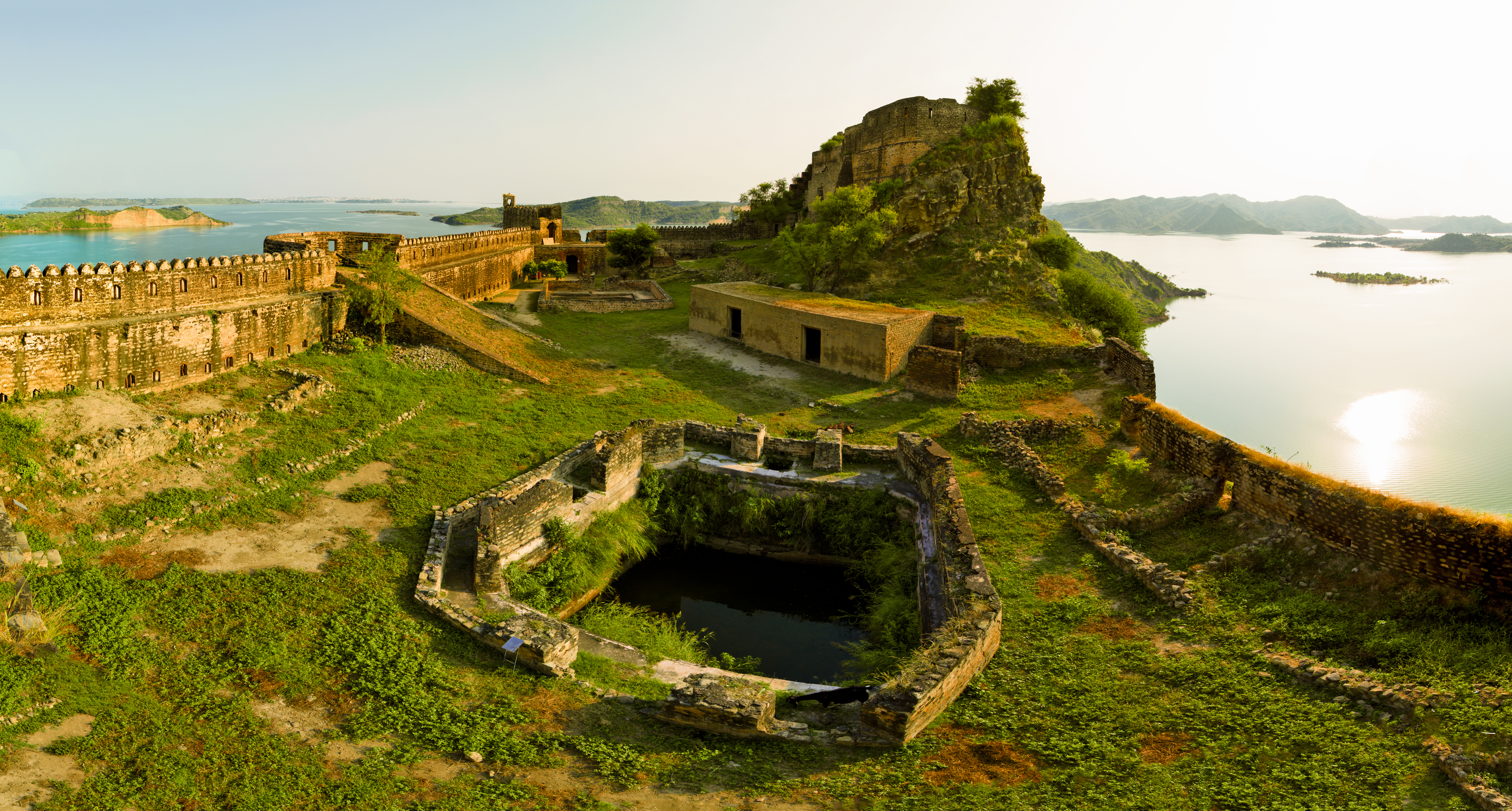
- View of Ramkot Fort
- Interactive map of the Ramkot Fort area

General information
- Location: Dadyal, Mirpur district, Azad Jammu and Kashmir
- Construction started: 16th century AD

Ramkot Fort (Urdu: قلعہ رام کوٹ, romanized: Qila Ram Kot) is a medieval fort in Mirpur, Azad Kashmir, Pakistan. The fort is accessible via three routes from Dina, Dadyal, and Mirpur, with 440 stairs leading to the main gate, which is built on a sloped rock for defensive purposes.

== History ==
The medieval original fort was constructed in the 5th century and occupied in 1186 during the Ghurid dynasty by Sultan Muhammad of Ghor, according to the information board at the entrance, but that fort is no longer in existence. In the late 14th century, the fort was under the control of Jasrat, a Punjabi Khokhar chieftain. At this fort, Khokhars clashed with and defeated the invading armies of Amir Timur in 1398. However, the current structure probably dates to the 16th century.

A temple with a large red Shivalinga, dating back to the 5th century and brought from the Ganges River, suggests that Hindus constructed this fort earlier than originally thought. The presence of the Hindu mythological figure Ram Chandra's birthplace in nearby Pharwala may explain the fort's name. However, British geologist and historian Frederick Drew attributes the fort's construction to a Gakhar chief named Taghlu, contradicting the information board. The fort underwent renovation during the reign of Gakhar Queen Mangla, whose daughter married Mughal emperor Aurangzeb Alamgir's son.

Ramkot Fort held strategic importance, as one of the four ancient routes to Srinagar passed through it. The nearby Mangla Fort, is also significant for being the birthplace of Mian Muhammad Bakhsh, author of Saif-ul-Malook.

== Architecture ==
The main gate, constructed with red bricks, contrasts with the stone used elsewhere, suggesting possible destruction and reconstruction. A smaller gate at the back was likely used for escape.

The fort's interior features two large ponds for rainwater collection, essential due to its elevation and previous location at the confluence of the Jhelum and Poonch rivers. Collapsed rooms, raw iron deposits, and the superintendent's residence are found within the complex. The fort also includes a slope for hauling cannons, with a donated cannon on the rampart.

== Gallery ==
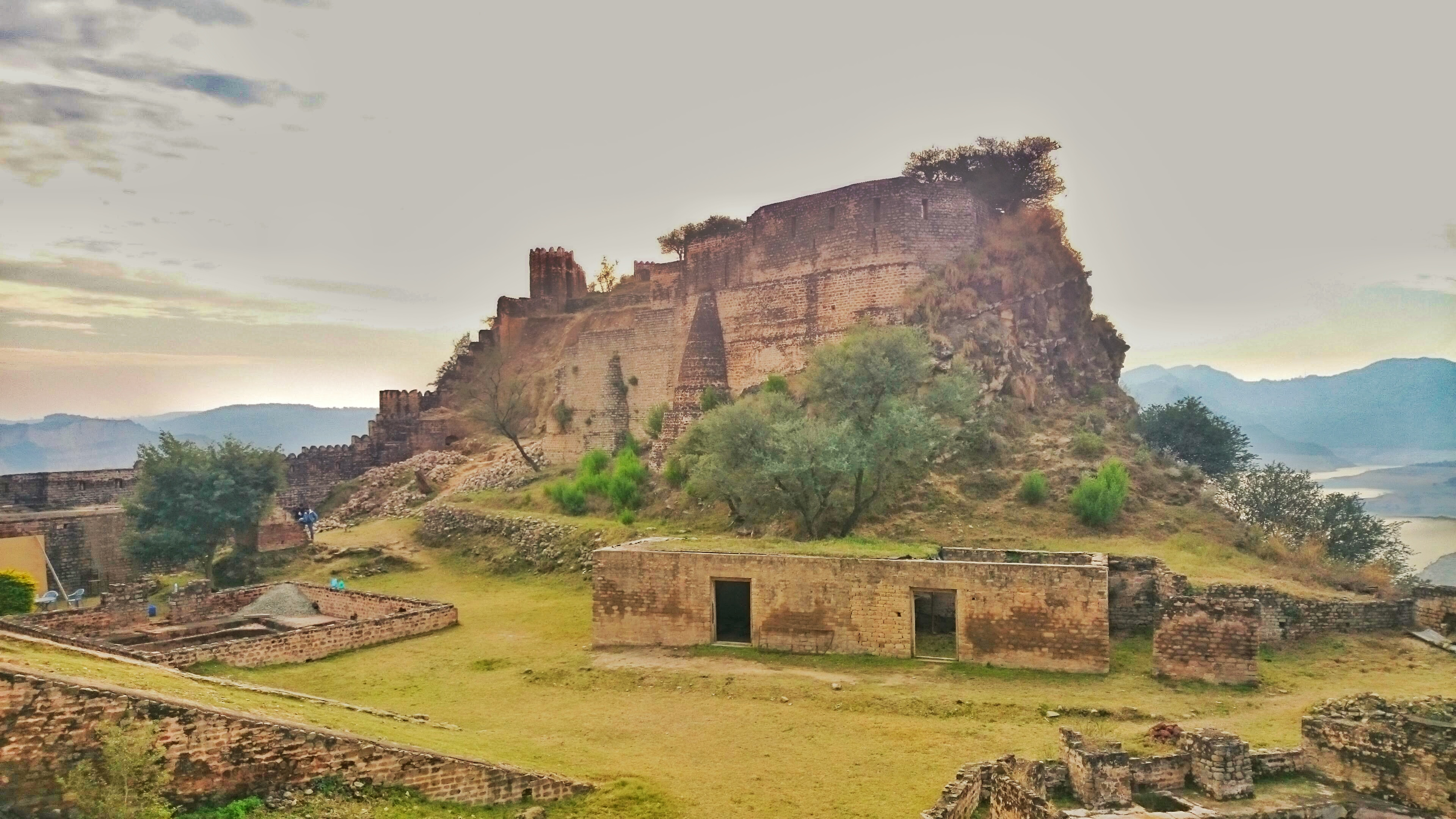
Landscape view

Bird's eye view

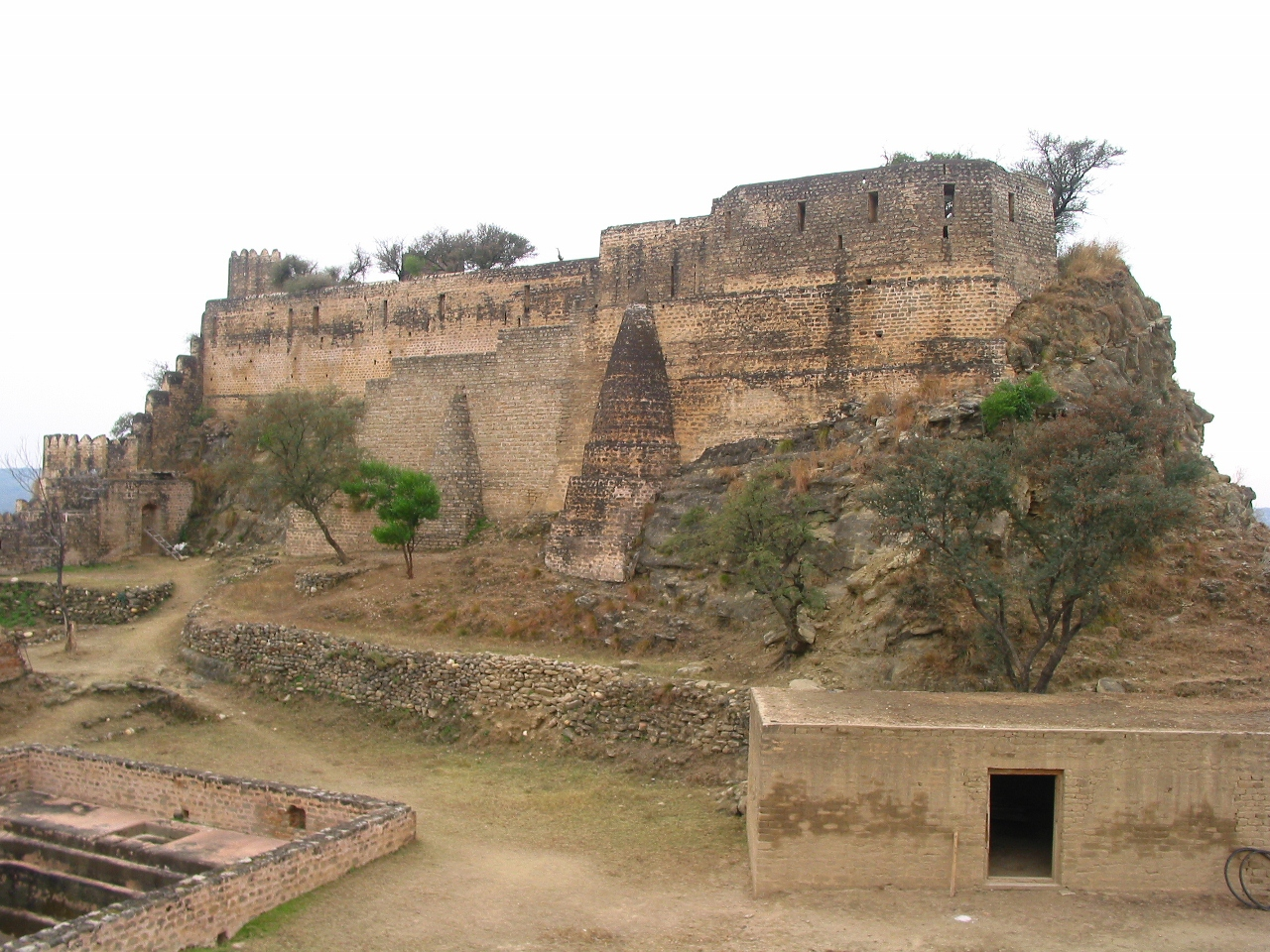
Courtyard

== See also ==
- List of UNESCO World Heritage Sites in Pakistan
- List of forts in Pakistan
- List of museums in Pakistan
