= Mirpur, Azad Kashmir =

City in Azad Kashmir, Pakistan-administered Kashmir

Mirpur: ميرپر (Potwari); میرپور (Urdu)
- City administered by Pakistan
- New Mirpur City
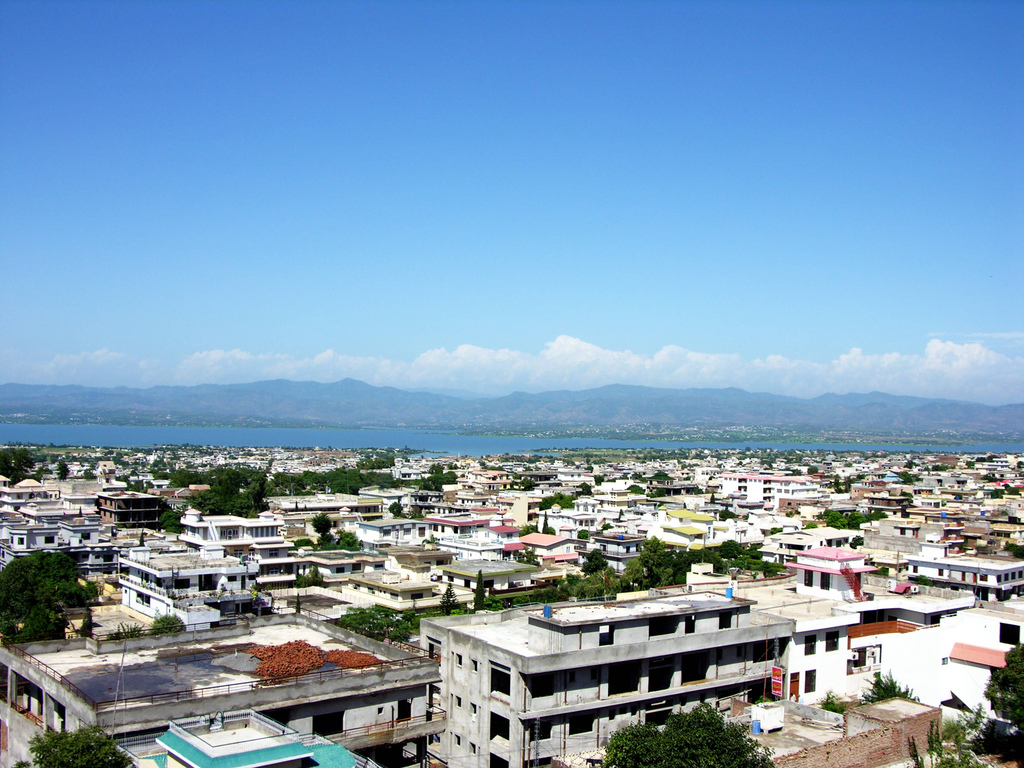
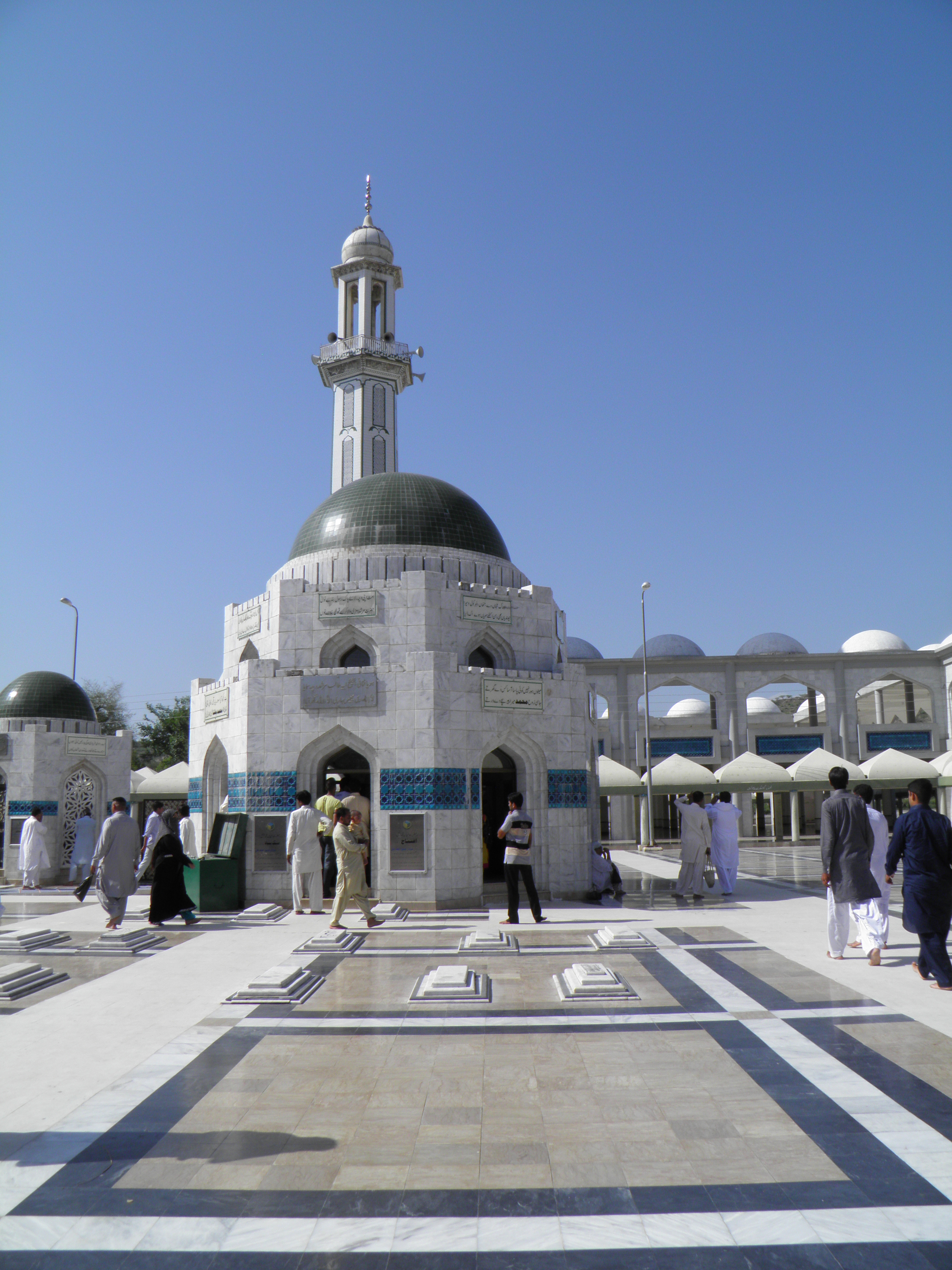
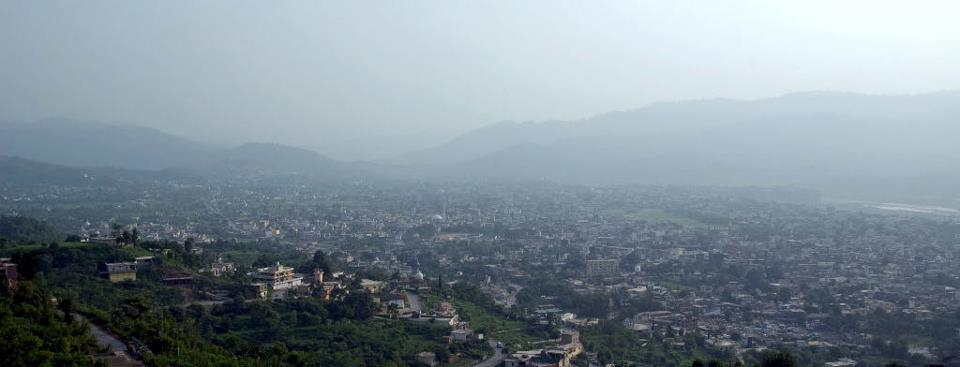
- Clockwise from the top: Mirpur City, Ramkot Fort, Panoramic view of the city, Tomb of Mian Muhammad Bakhsh,
- Nickname: Lil England
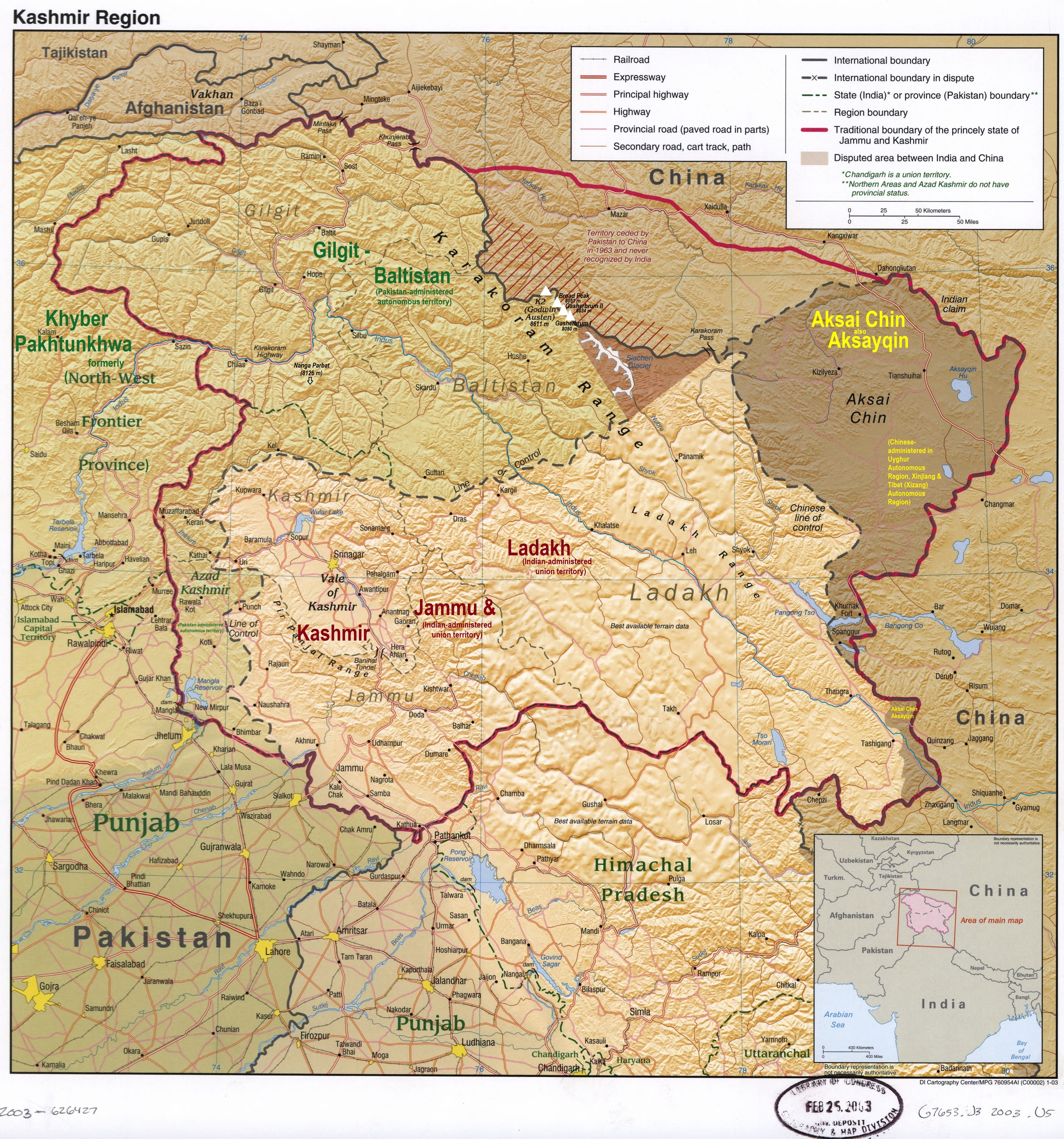
- A map showing Pakistan-administered Azad Kashmir shaded in sage in the disputed Kashmir region
- Interactive map of Mirpur
- Coordinates: 33°9′N 73°44′E
- Administering country: Pakistan
- Territory: Azad Kashmir
- Division: Mirpur
- District: Mirpur

Government
  - Type: Municipal Corporation
  - Body: Mirpur Development Authority
  - Mayor: Usman Ali Khalid (PTI)
  - Deputy Mayor: Ramzan Chughtai (PTI)
  - Deputy Commissioner: Ch. Amjad Iqbal BPS-18(PAS)
  - District Police Officer: Raja Irfan Salim BPS-18(PSP)
- Elevation: 458 m (1,503 ft)

Population (2017)
  - City: 124,352
  - Rank: 89th in Pakistan

Languages
  - Official: Urdu (Note: Snedden (2013, p. 176): On p. 29, the census report states that Urdu is the official language of the government of Azad Kashmir, with Kashmiri, Pahari, Gojri, Punjabi, Kohistani, Pushto, and Sheena 'frequently spoken in Azad Kashmir'. When surveyed about their 'mother tongue', Azad Kashmiris' choices were limited to selecting from Pakistan's major languages: Urdu, Punjabi, Sindhi, Pushto, Balochi, and 'others'; 2.18 million of Azad Kashmir's 2.97 million people chose 'others'.)
  - Spoken: Pahari-Pothwari/Punjabi; Gojri; Urdu; Kashmiri; English
- Time zone: UTC+5 (PKT)
- Calling code: 05827
- Number of Tehsils: 3
- Number of Union councils: 21

Mirpur, (Note: Potwari: ميرپر [mɪɾˈpəɾᵊ]; Urdu: ميرپور [miːɾˈpuːɾ]) officially known as New Mirpur City, is the capital of Mirpur district located in Pakistani-administered Azad Kashmir in the disputed Kashmir region. It is the second largest city of Azad Kashmir and the 89th most populous city in Pakistan.

A significant portion of the population from the district, the Mirpuri diaspora, migrated to the United Kingdom in the mid-to-late 1950s and in the early 1960s. Mirpur is thus sometimes known as "Little England" or "Little Britain". Many British products are found, and many shops in the city accept the pound sterling.

== History ==
The city of Mirpur was founded in around 1640 AD or 1050 AH by the local Ghakhar chief Miran Shah Ghazi during Mughal rule. The Imperial Gazetteer of India Provincial Series Kashmir and Jammu (1909) reports that Mirpur "is said to have been founded by Miran Shah Ghazi and Sultan Fateh Khan." An alternative view is that the city was founded by Mira Shah Gazi and Gosain Bodhpuri, both regarded as saints. The word 'Mir' was taken from the name of the former and 'Pur’ from the latter.

The area that is now Mirpur has been historically associated with Pothohar region of Punjab, though the modern demarcation of Pothohar devised by the British excludes Mirpur, by using the Jhelum River as its eastern boundary. By the end of the 18th century, Gakhar power in Pothohar had declined. Mirpur had become part of Chibb, which ruled the state of Khari Khariyali with its capital located at Mangla Fort. With the rise of the Sikh power in the Punjab, Maharaja Ranjit Singh established his position and set his eyes to the north on the Chibh states of Bhimber and Khari Khariyali. In 1810, a force was sent against Raja Sultan Khan of Bhimber and was met with fierce resistance, causing the Sikhs and their Dogra allies to retreat. However, in 1812 another Sikh army under prince Kharak Singh defeated Raja Sultan Khan, and the Bhimber state was annexed as Jagir of Kharak Singh. Around the same time, Ranjit Singh acquired Gujrat and invaded Khari Khariyali, then ruled by Raja Umar Khan. Exhausted by conflict, Raja Umar Khan made peace with Ranjit Singh; but before a settlement could be made, he died. The state and Mirpur ultimately became part of Ranjit Singh's territories.

In 1808, Ranjit Singh annexed Jammu state, which had been a tributary since 1780. In 1820, he awarded Jammu to his commander Gulab Singh, who hailed from Jammu and had been under the service of Ranjit Singh for the past eight years. Between 1831 and 1839 Ranjit Singh bestowed on Gulab Singh the royalty of the salt mines in northern Punjab, and the northern Punjab towns including Bhera, Jhelum, Rohtas and Gujrat. Gulab Singh kept on expanding his kingdom, and in 1840, Baltistan was made subject to Jammu while Gilgit fell to a Sikh force from Kashmir in 1842. The state of Kashmir was annexed by Ranjit Singh in 1819. However, the rebellion in Hazara in the beginning of 1846 compelled the country to be transferred to Raja Gulab Singh of Jammu as well.

Ranjit Singh had given Poonch, Mirpur, and Bhimber as a Jagir to Gulab Singh's younger brother Dhian Singh. However, in 1843 Dhian Singh died, and Gulab Singh considered these areas now part of his territory. He was not able to establish full control due to resistance movements.

As an aftermath of the First Anglo-Sikh War and the Treaty of Lahore, the Treaty of Amritsar was signed between the British East India company and Raja Gulab Singh of Jammu on March 16, 1846. The British Government sold Kashmir to the Raja of Jammu for 75 lakhs Nanak Shahi Rupees. This treaty transferred to him all the hill states between Ravi and Indus. The transfer included Kashmir, Hazara, and the southern hill states, including the former Khari Khariyali, thus sealing the fate of Mirpur with the new state of Jammu and Kashmir.

=== Early Mirpur ===
Since Mirpur lies in between where the Jhelum River meets the densely forested foothills of the Pir Panjal mountains and above the plains of the largely treeless Punjab, it was an ideal spot for the construction of the boats used to carry goods from the Himalayas down the five rivers of the Punjab to the Indus River and on to the seaports in the Indus delta. Traders have been operating from there across the Indian Ocean for more than three thousand years. Most of the crew on the boats trading up and down the Punjab and Indus River system were drawn from Mirpur, as training as a boatbuilder was a necessary prerequisite for becoming a boatman.

=== British Dominion ===
On 1 April 1847 Captain James Abbott, who was demarcating the Punjab-Kashmir boundary after the First Anglo-Sikh War, noted in his journal "Marched to Meerpoor. As the boundary between Lahore and Jammu and Kashmir for many miles is the stream of the river Jhelum, no boundary pillars are requisite during that extent of limit. I am therefore hastening to the point at which the boundary quits the Jelum". He noted that there was no need to erect boundary pillars as the River Jhelum formed the boundary along that stretch land.

The following day, Abbott noted, "Boundary pillars in earth are now set up from the Ravi to the Jelum, about two-thirds of the entire line of frontier between the States."

During the modern period of the Dogra principality, a British dominion, the thriving river trade diminished due to colonial construction of railway lines from Bombay and Karachi into the interior of the Sindh and Punjab.

=== Independence and War ===
After the Partition of India, the city was part of the princely state of Jammu and Kashmir led by Maharaja Hari Singh, which chose to remain independent. During the Indo-Pakistani War of 1947–1948, Mirpur was captured by the local rebels and tribal forces. Local intervention on 25 November 1947 contributed to it becoming part of Azad Kashmir.

== Geography ==
Mirpur lies at the foothills of the Himalayas mountain range of an altitude of 648 metres or 2,126 feet above sea level and is linked with the main Peshawar-Lahore Grand Trunk Road at Dina Tehsil in Jhelum District. It is the headquarters of Mirpur District, which has two subdivisions: Mirpur and Dudial.

== Climate ==
Mirpur has a humid subtropical climate. The average annual temperature is 25.1 °C. The average annual rainfall is 1,380 millimetres or 54.3 inches. Since it is in the extreme south of Jammu and Kashmir, the city has a climate that is extremely hot during summer, making it very similar to the Pakistani areas of Jhelum and Gujar Khan.

Climate data for Mirpur, Azad Kashmir
Month	Jan	Feb	Mar	Apr	May	Jun	Jul	Aug	Sep	Oct	Nov	Dec	Year
Mean daily maximum °C (°F)	18.8 (65.8)	21.4 (70.5)	27.8 (82.0)	33.9 (93.0)	39.2 (102.6)	41.0 (105.8)	37.0 (98.6)	34.5 (94.1)	34.3 (93.7)	31.4 (88.5)	26.8 (80.2)	21.1 (70.0)	30.6 (87.1)
Mean daily minimum °C (°F)	3.9 (39.0)	6.1 (43.0)	10.1 (50.2)	13.8 (56.8)	19.4 (66.9)	23.4 (74.1)	27.4 (81.3)	27.6 (81.7)	26.7 (80.1)	18.5 (65.3)	10.3 (50.5)	4.2 (39.6)	15.9 (60.7)
Average rainfall mm (inches)	78 (3.1)	142 (5.6)	139 (5.5)	98 (3.9)	44 (1.7)	98 (3.9)	281 (11.1)	270 (10.6)	104 (4.1)	38 (1.5)	36 (1.4)	48 (1.9)	1,376 (54.3)
Average rainy days (≥ 1.0 mm)	5	7	8	7	8	9	19	20	11	4	2	3	103
Average relative humidity (%)	66	64	57	45	35	43	71	78	70	57	58	62	59
Source 1:
Source 2:

== Industry ==
The government of Azad Jammu and Kashmir has promoted the industrial development of Mirpur and private investment in a diverse economy: foam, polypropylene, synthetic yarn, motorbikes and scooters, textiles, vegetable oil (ghee), wood and sawmills, soap, cosmetics, marble, ready-made garments, matches and rosin, turpentine. The economy of Mirpur contributes to the economy of Azad Kashmir. However, much of the infrastructure still needs improvement so that higher-quality products can be produced.

As part of the relief and compensation package in the wake of the Mangla Dam, a new city is being developed along the southeastern outskirts of Mirpur, with the main city of Mirpur being expanded. Much construction is occurring throughout the district by Pakistani and Chinese contractors, raising the dam. Four towns in the district have been planned near the new city to resettle the population affected by the project.

== Education ==
English is common in educational institutes. Previously, the University of Azad Jammu & Kashmir was the only institution for higher studies but there have been significant changes in the educational infrastructure. The Mirpur University of Science and Technology (MUST), the Akson College of Health Science and the Mohtarma Benazir Bhutto Shaheed Medical College have been formed.

The AJK Board of Intermediate and Secondary Education, Mirpur is responsible for the studies at lower levels. In addition to the state-run schools and colleges, Mirpur has a well-developed private sector providing the education to all sections of the society:

Other notable colleges and schools include:

- The City School
- Mohi ud Din Islamic Institute of Pharmaceutical Sciences
- Roots Millennium Schools
- Beaconhouse School System

== Sports ==
Football, cricket and volleyball are popular in Mirpur. Mirpur has a cricket stadium, Quaid-e-Azam Stadium.

There are registered sports clubs: Al-Fatah Cricket Club is one of the top clubs in the city which is among the top 10 Clubs of Pakistan. Other clubs include Eagle star Cricket Club, South Asia Cricket Club. Notable cricketers include Zaman Khan who plays for Lahore Qalandars in Pakistan Super League, Hassan Raza who has represented Pakistan in U-19 world Cup and Shadab Khan who is also playing for Northerns in the Quaid-e-Azam Trophy.

Pilot Football Club, Youth Football Club and Kashmir National FC. The district football team of Mirpur take part in the All Azad Jammu and Kashmir football championships.

== Transport ==
Auto rickshaws are very popular mode of transport for short routes within the city. The city's transport system links it to a number of destinations in Azad Kashmir notably Bhimber, Jatlan, Chakswari, Dadyal, Kotli and Khoi Ratta and to major cities in Pakistan as well as including services to Gujrat, Jhelum, Kharian, Gujranwala, Lahore and Rawalpindi. There is no railway station in Mirpur. The closest station is in Dina. The promise of a rail extension to Mirpur has not been fulfilled.

Islamabad Airport, which services the Mirpur region, is 130 km away. Sialkot International Airport is 110 kilometres away. An international airport has been planned. The location of the airport has not been determined, but possible locations near Mirpur are Mangla, Jatlan and Bhalwhara. In August 2013, the National Assembly and the prime minister approved the airport. It was determined that the airport would be constructed in two years after funding. The promise of an international airport is yet to be fulfilled, and a group of British MPs have written to the Pakistani PM to bring it to his attention.

== Demographics ==
Population

Historical population
Year	Pop.	±% p.a.
2017	124,352	—

According to the 2017 census, Mirpur had a population of 124,352. Mirpur's original population comprises different tribes similar to that of Punjab. However, since 1947, residents from the neighbouring Rajouri and Poonch districts of the Indian administered Jammu and Kashmir have largely settled in the Mirpur city and the surrounding areas. The bulk of the Mirpuri diaspora resides in England.

=== Hindu and Sikh communities ===
Before the Kashmir War in 1947, the Mirpur District had about 75,000 Hindu and Sikhs, who made the majority population of Mirpur city and amounted up to 20 percent of the population of the district. A great majority of them lived in the principal towns of Mirpur, Kotli and Bhimber. Many Hindu and Sikh refugees from the Potohar region of Northern Punjab had taken refuge in Mirpur town, causing the non-Muslim population to increase by 25,000. On 25 November 1947, tribesmen and Pakistani military members attacked and seized the city. Of the minority population, only about 2,500 Hindus or Sikhs escaped to the Jammu and Kashmir along with the State Forces. The remainder were marched to Alibeg, where a gurdwara was converted into a prison camp, but the raiders killed 20,000 of the captives along the way and abducted 5,000 women. Only about 5,000 made it to Alibeg, but they continued to be killed at a gradual pace by the captors. In March 1948, the ICRC rescued 1,600 of the survivors from Alibeg, who were resettled to Jammu and other areas of India.

=== Languages ===
Approximate language breakdown in Mirpur District
1. Pahari–Pothwari (Punjabi Dialect) (85.0%)
2. Gojri (10.0%)
3. Others (5.00%)

Around 85% of the population in Mirpur District, Azad Kashmir speaks the Mirpuri dialect of Pahari–Pothwari a Western Punjabi language variety, forming the overwhelming linguistic core of the region. Gojri speakers account for roughly 10%, reflecting the long established Gujjar presence across the district. The remaining 5% comprises a mixture of smaller language communities.

== Landmarks ==
There are the following places of interest:

- Khari Sharif Darbar
- Mangla Dam
- Mangla Fort
- Ramkot Fort

== Notable people ==
- Nazir Ahmed, Baron Ahmed – former Member of the British House of Lords
- Rehman Chisti, Member of British Parliament.
- Mian Muhammad Bakhsh – Sufi saint, Poet
- Shabana Mahmood-British Home Secretary
- Sultan Mehmood Chaudhry – politician, President of Azad Kashmir since 2021
- Dynamo-magician
- Jaykae-rapper
- JJ esko-rapper
- Zidane Iqbal-footballer
- Jameela Jamil- actress
- Shakira Khan-reality TV star
- Zaman Khan – cricketer
- Chaudhry Abdul Majid – politician who served as the Prime Minister of Azad Jammu and Kashmir from 2011 to 2016
- Zayn Malik-singer
- Afaq Raheem – first-class Pakistani cricketer
- Baba Shadi Shaheed – Sufi saint
- Zarah Sultana-British politician
- Jamil Rahmat Vance – Retired Two Star General of Pakistan Army
- Krishan Dev Sethi- Social Leader, Political Leader, Activist for Abolition of Interest-based lending in Jammu & Kashmir

== Friendship cities ==
Mirpur has friendly relations with:

- Birmingham, England, United Kingdom
- Bradford, England, United Kingdom
- London, England, United Kingdom

== See also ==
- British Mirpuri community
- Chowk Shaheedan
- Maqbool Butt
- Mirpur Development Authority (MDA)

== Bibliography ==
- Puri, Luv (2013), Across the Line of Control: Inside Azad Kashmir, Columbia University Press, ISBN 978-0-231-80084-6
- Rahman, Tariq (1996). Language and politics in Pakistan. Oxford University Press. ISBN 978-0-19-577692-8.
- Snedden, Christopher (2013) [first published as The Untold Story of the People of Azad Kashmir, 2012], Kashmir: The Unwritten History, HarperCollins India, ISBN 978-9350298985
