= Barnala Tehsil =

Tehsil in Azad Kashmir, Pakistan

Barnala برنالہ
- City
- Location within Azad Kashmir Location within Pakistan
- Coordinates: 32°52′14″N 74°14′51″E
- Country: Pakistan
- Territory: Azad Kashmir
- District: Bhimber
- Established: 1996
- Elevation: 313 m (1,027 ft)

Population (2020)
  - Total: 150,000
- Time zone: UTC+5 (PST)
- Postal code: 10020
- Dialling code: 0092-05828
- Website: Official Website

Barnala (Urdu: برنالہ) is a tehsil (subdistrict) of Bhimber District in Azad Kashmir, Pakistan.
