= Murray College =

Government college in Punjab, Pakistan

Coordinates: 32.4991245°N 74.5492795°E

Government Murray College Sialkot
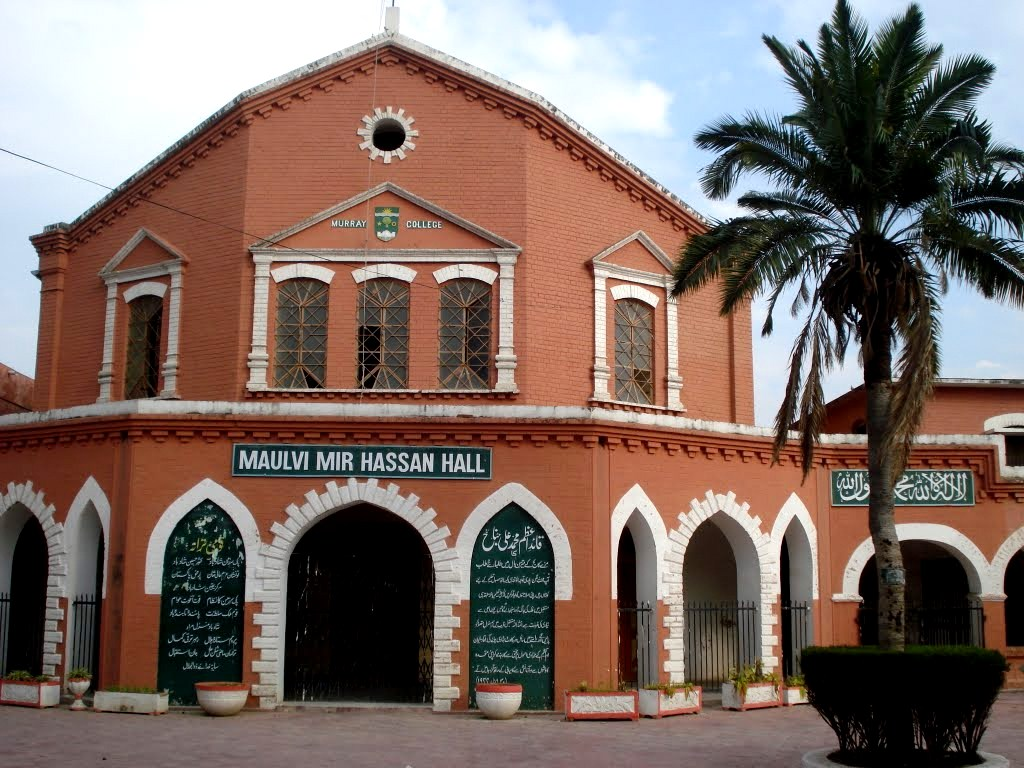
- Government Murray College Sialkot
- Former name: Scotch Mission College
- Motto: Urdu: ایمان ، اتحاد ، نظم (Iman, Ittehad, Tanzeem)
- Motto in English: Faith, Unity, Discipline
- Type: Public and Co-educational
- Established: 1889
- Affiliations: Higher Education Commission University of the Punjab University of Gujrat
- Students: 6000
- Undergraduates: 2000 (2013)
- Postgraduates: 600
- Location: Sialkot, Punjab, Pakistan
- Campus: Urban
- Website: murraycollege.edu.pk

Government Murray College Sialkot, also known as Murray College, is a government college located in Sialkot in the Punjab province of Pakistan.

== History ==
Government Murray College Sialkot was established as Scotch Mission College by Scottish missionaries belonging to the Church of Scotland Mission in 1889. The Church of Scotland came to Sialkot (then Part of British India) in January 1857 when the first Scottish missionary, Reverend Thomas Hunter, came to live with his wife, Jane Scott, and baby son near the Brigade Parade Ground, facing the Trinity Church (whose first stone was laid on 1 March 1852). The church was consecrated by the Bishop of Madras on 30 January 1857. Sialkot at that time was in the diocese of Calcutta in British India. Thomas Hunter, his wife and baby son were murdered in Sialkot during the Indian Rebellion of 1857 against the rule of the British East India Company.

In 1972, the government of Pakistan dismissed the Scottish missionaries and nationalised the institution.

In 2005, a new block was established at the college by the Government of Pakistan. There is a private graveyard within the premises of the college which belongs to the Khan family of mori gate sialkot. The land of the college was donated by this family who kept some piece of land for themselves.

== Hostels ==
There is no hostel at the college for girls.

== Faculties and departments ==
Murray College consists of three faculties and following departments are associated with these faculties;

1. Faculty of Natural Sciences
  1. Department of Chemistry
  2. Department of Information Technology
  3. Department of Mathematics
  4. Department of Physics
  5. Department of Statistics
2. Faculty of Social Sciences
  1. Department of BBA
  2. Department of English
  3. Department of Political science
  4. Department of Islamic Studies
  5. Department of Psychology
  6. Department of Urdu
  7. Department of Economics
3. Faculty of Biological Sciences
  1. Department of Botany
  2. Department of Zoology

== Library ==
- Allama Iqbal Library

== Principals ==
- Captain Jhon Murray
- Rev. Jhon Waugh (1909–1914)
- Rev. Dr. William Scott (1914–1923)
- Rev. Jhon Garret (1923–1914)
- Rev. D. Leslie Scott (1947–1956)
- R.C. Thomas
- F.S. KhairUllah
- Ahmed Raza Siddiqui
- Qamar Malik
- Prof. Muhammad Arshad Siddiqui

== Notable alumni ==
- Muhammad Iqbal, philosopher, lawyer, and politician
- Muhammad Ibrahim Mir Sialkoti, religious activist and activist of the Pakistan Movement
- Faiz Ahmed, several times nominee for the Nobel Peace Prize
- Kuldip Nayar, Indian journalist
- Manzoor Mirza, Educationist, economist and book author
- Mumtaz Hamid Rao, head of news and current affairs of Pakistan Television
- Zaheer Abbas, former captain of Pakistani National Cricket Team
- Khalid Hasan, Pakistani journalist
- Umera Ahmed, Pakistani writer, author and screenwriter
