= Pir Chinasi =

Hill station in Azad Kashmir, Pakistan

Coordinates: 34.3891°N 73.5499°E

Pir Chinasi پیر چناسی
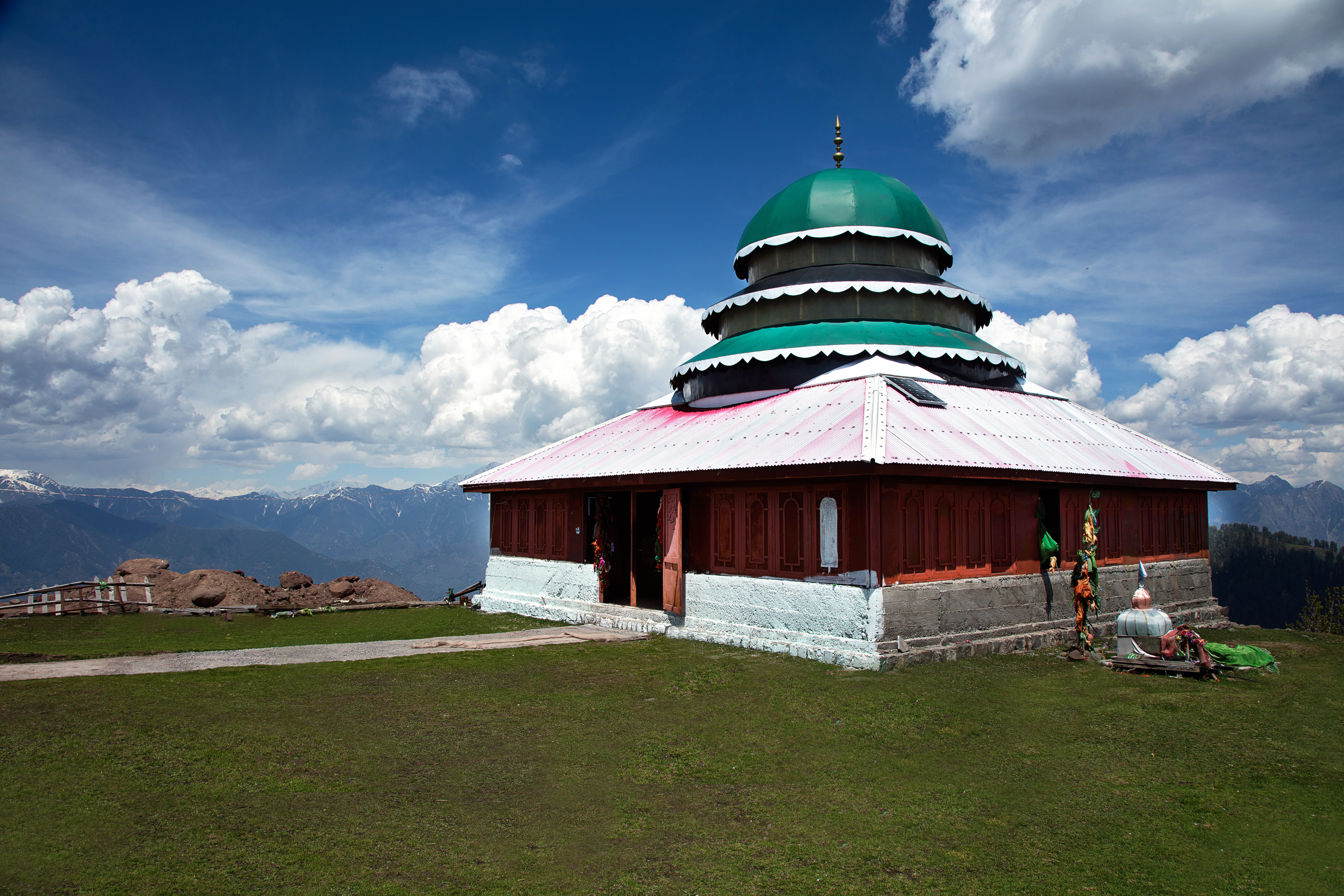
- The area is famous as home of the Pir Chinasi shrine

- Location within Azad Kashmir Location within Pakistan

Religion
- Affiliation: Islam

Location
- Location: Muzaffarabad District
- State: Azad Kashmir
- Country: Pakistan

Architecture
- Type: Mosque and Sufi mausoleum
- Dome: 1

Pir Chinasi (also spelled as Peer Chinasi) is a shrine and a tourist destination located about 30 kilometers (19 mi) east of Muzaffarabad, the capital city of POK

administered by Pakistan. It is located on the top of hills at the height of 2,900 metres (9,500 ft). The mountain peak has gained large fame for its ziyarat of a famous saint, Sayed Hussain Shah Bukhari.

This place is also visited by tourists, for the view of Muzaffarabad and rural areas around the hidden city. The area is also famous for paragliding and snow cross jeep rallies.
