= Quaid-e-Azam Tourist Lodge =

Quaid-e-Azam Tourist Lodge قائدِ اعظم سیاحی لاج
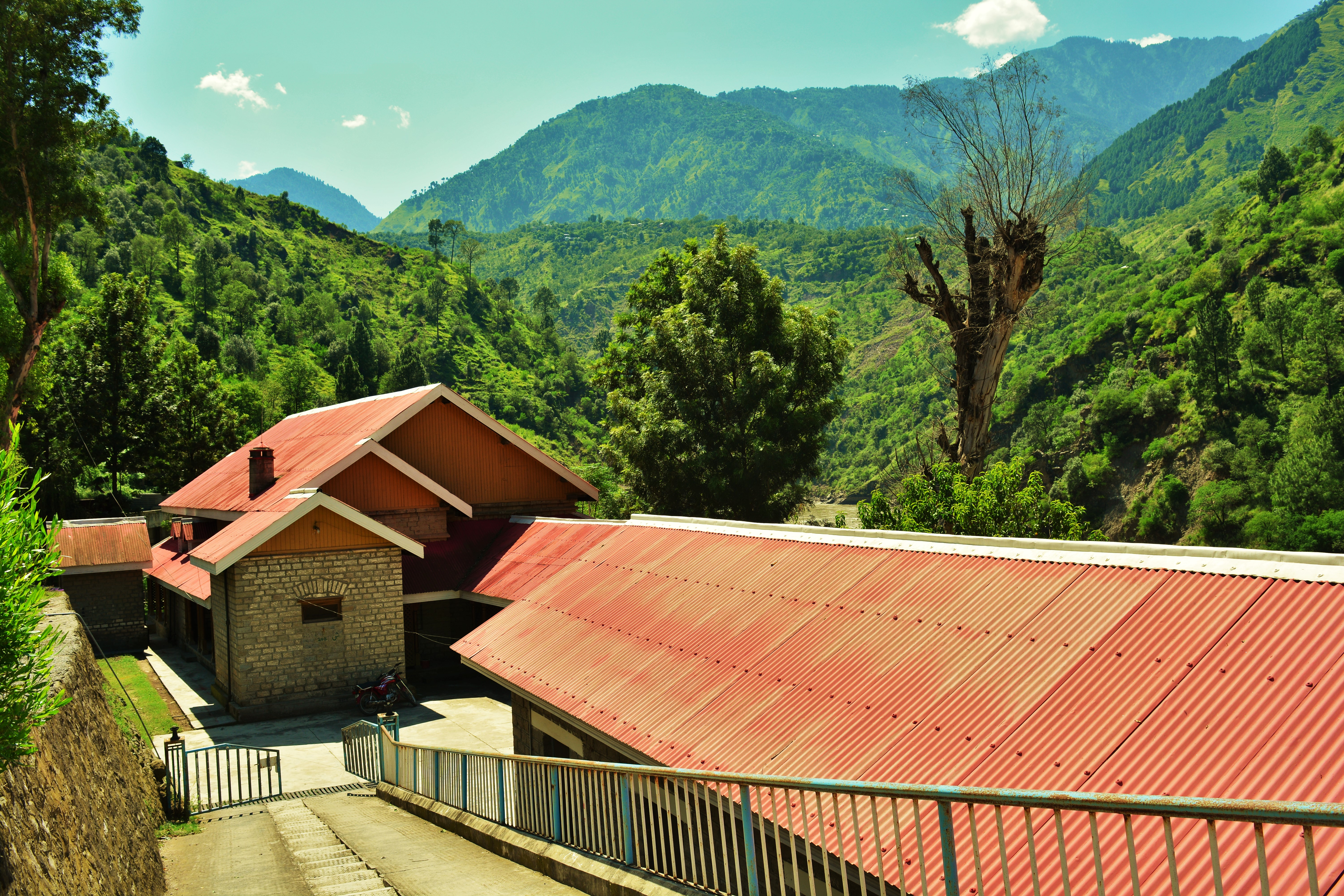
- Panoramic view of the lodge

General information
- Location: Muzaffarabad District, Azad Kashmir, Pakistan
- Coordinates: 34°7′47.85″N 73°29′49.4″E

Quaid-e-Azam Tourist Lodge (Urdu: قائدِ اعظم سیاحی لاج), also known as the Barsala Tourist Lodge, Dak Bungalow, and Quaid-i-Azam Memorial Rest House, is a historic dak bungalow located in Kohala, Muzaffarabad District, Azad Kashmir. It is named after the first Pakistani governor-general, Muhammad Ali Jinnah known as Quaid-e-Azam, who resided there in 1944.

== Location ==
The lodge serves as a popular tourist attraction. It is located at a distance of 100 km (62 mi) from Islamabad, the Pakistani capital, and 40 km (25 mi) from Muree. On the way to Muzaffarabad, the Azad Kashmir capital, it is only 3 km (2 mi) from the Kohala Bridge, that serves as the entry point to Azad Kashmir.

== Historical significance ==
The lodge was first built during the Dogra rule by the Hindu Dogra dynasty. The founder of Pakistan, Quaid-e-Azam Mohammad Ali Jinnah, and his sister Madar-e-Millat Fatima Jinnah, stayed here on 25 July 1944 when they were returning from Srinagar on their way to Rawalpindi. A wall plaque was unveiled by the then Azad Kashmir Prime Minister Sardar Sikandar Hayat Khan on 14 August 2001, commemorating the visit of Jinnah. The chair used by Jinnah has been preserved and can be seen in the lodge.

== 2005 earthquake ==
On 8 October 2005, the historic lodge was damaged by a 7.6 MW earthquake with epicenter at Muzaffarabad. Efforts were undertaken by the Government of Azad Kashmir to restore the heritage site, and the AJK Tourism and Archeology Department repaired the tourist point. It now has seven rooms for tourists.

== See also ==
- List of cultural heritage sites in Azad Kashmir
- List of cultural heritage sites in Pakistan
