= Samahni Tehsil =

Tehsil in Azad Kashmir, Pakistan

Samahni سماہنی
- Tehsil
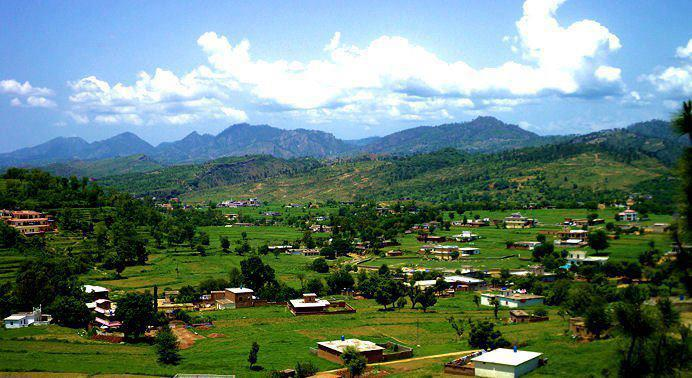
- Jandala, Samahni (2010)

- Location within Azad Kashmir Location within Pakistan
- Coordinates: 33°05′26″N 74°08′07″E
- Administering country: Pakistan
- Territory: Azad Kashmir
- Division: Mirpur
- District: Bhimber

Area
  - Total: 456 km^{2} (176 sq mi)

Population (2017)
  - Total: 121,946
  - Density: 267/km^{2} (693/sq mi)
- Time zone: UTC+5 (PKT)

Samahni (Urdu: سماہنی) is a tehsil of Bhimber District in Azad Kashmir, a part of Kashmir administered by Pakistan. It is situated in the district's south, along the Line of Control with India. As of the 2017 Pakistani census, the population of Samahni was 121,946.

== History ==
Three former members of the Azad Kashmir Legislative Assembly – Raja Razaq Ahmed, Raja Maqsood Ahmed Khan, and Raja Munirullah Khan – led a convoy of over a hundred vehicles through Samahni in a protest on 11 July 2012. Protesters demanded that authorities find and arrest the perpetrators of eight murders in the tehsil, which stemmed from a feud between two families.

Ten schoolgirls in Samahni were wounded by gunfire on 19 January 2018. Pakistani authorities blamed India, claiming its soldiers had fired across the Line of Control.

On 21 December 2024, a wooden footbridge in Samahni collapsed, sending seven schoolgirls ten to fifteen feet to the water below. Six of the seven students were injured, although none seriously. Locals consequently petitioned authorities to rebuild the bridge, which had been built in the late 1980s and had been in poor condition prior to the incident.

A ₨1,000,000,000, 132/11 kV electric grid station was opened in Samahni on 11 May 2026, the first of its kind in the tehsil. Locals had long petitioned for a stronger voltage, as they previously only had access to less than 90 V.

== Administration and geography ==
Samahni is located in the south of Bhimber District in Azad Kashmir, a part of Kashmir administered by Pakistan, along the Line of Control with India. It is situated some 17 kilometres north of the district capital Bhimber. Administratively it is a tehsil (subdistrict) whose local government has jurisdiction over 47 villages within its borders.

The tehsil is known for its forested hills and valleys, which are collectively known as the Samahni Valley.

== Demographics ==
The 2017 Pakistani census recorded 121,946 people living in 18,137 households in Samahni.
