= Jamil Rahmat Vance =

Pakistani army general

Military service
- Allegiance: Pakistan
- Branch/service: Pakistan Army

Jamil Rahmat Vance is a retired major general of the Pakistan Army.

== Early life ==
He was born in the small village of Uchi Lass, located about a kilometer from the town of Islamgarh in Mirpur and Azad Kashmir, Pakistan.

His uncle, a retired Colonel from the Pakistan Army, inspired him to join as a commissioning officer.

== Military career ==
He was promoted to Major General on 10 August 2011.
