= Nandwal =

- Interactive map of Nandwal
- Country: Pakistan
- Province: Punjab
- District: Gujrat
- Tehsil: Kharian

Nandwal (نندوال) is a village in Gujrat District, Punjab, Pakistan. Punjabi is the mother tongue of the village community, though most of the people, especially the youth, can speak Urdu, the national language. The village comprises mainly Chib caste of Rajput clan. People wear shalwar kameez though many old people wear dhoti too. Wheat is the main crop and farming is the most important occupation of the people. The village has a central mosque named Masjid Gulzar-e-Habib. There is also a famous shrine (Khanqah).
