= Mirpuri diaspora =

Pakistani Mirpuris living outside Mirpur, Pakistan-Administered Kashmir

Mirpuris
میرپوری

Languages
- Pahari-Pothwari, Urdu

Religion
- Predominately: Islam Minority: Hinduism, Sikhism

The Mirpuri diaspora consists of Pahari people originating from the Mirpur Division (the districts of Kotli, Mirpur and Bhimber) of Azad Kashmir, Pakistan, now living outside that district. Migration from Mirpur started occurring in the 1920s, when many Mirpuris left for Bombay to work on merchant ships.

During the partition of British India in 1947, many Mirpuri Hindus and Mirpuri Sikhs were forced to flee to cities in the princely state of Jammu and Kashmir to escape Muslim violence. The construction of the Mangla Dam by the Pakistani Government in the 1960s flooded fertile agricultural lands, forcing many Mirpuri Muslims to migrate to the United Kingdom to survive on work as labourers.

== India ==
In the 1920s, some Mirpuris left the area for Bombay, to work on the merchant ships of British India.

Just before the partition of India, there were over 114,000 Mirpuri Hindus and Mirpuri Sikhs living in the districts which later became Azad Kashmir. Many of them were engaged in business. After the partition of India, in what is known as the 1947 Mirpur massacre, females belonging to the Hindu and Sikh communities of Mirpur were abducted and raped by Pakistani tribals, with many Hindu Mirpuris and Sikh Mirpuris being forced to flee to Jammu and other parts of India. In total, approximately 20,000 Hindu Mirpuris and Sikh Mirpuris were massacred by Pakistani tribals as they were fleeing, while the remaining number found refuge in the state of Jammu and Kashmir, where they settled in the cities of Jammu, Kathua, Rajouri, Poonch and Udhampur. By 1951, only 790 Hindu and Sikh Mirpuris remained in their hometown.

== Pakistan ==
In the 1880s colonial India, some Mirpuris migrated to the city of Karachi to work on merchant ships.

Within Pakistan, Azad Kashmiris have migrated towards many provinces outside of Azad Jammu and Kashmir, chiefly Punjab, Sindh (particularly Karachi) and the capital territory of Islamabad.

== United Kingdom ==
While no accurate statistics are available, an estimated 60 to 70 per cent of British Pakistanis in England trace their origins to the administrative territory of Azad Kashmir in northeastern Pakistan, mainly from the Mirpur, Kotli and Bhimber districts. Many of these individuals migrated to the United Kingdom in the 1960s to work as labourers after the construction of the Mangla Dam by the Pakistani government flooded agricultural fields. The majority of them adhere to the Barelvi movement of Sunni Islam. Large Mirpuri communities can be found in Birmingham, Bradford, Manchester, Leeds, Luton and the surrounding towns.
