= Baba Shadi Shaheed =

Sufi saint

Hazrat Sheikh Shadi Shaheed (also known as Maharaja Dharam Chand Chib) was a Sufi saint and a member of the Chib Rajput lineage. He was a contemporary and feudatory of the Mughal emperors Babur, Humayun, and Akbar. According to tradition, he was the first Chib Rajput to marry into the Mughal imperial family, entering into a marital alliance during the reign of Babur. Regional account describe him as a respected figure known for his wisdom and martial ability, who was in conflict with Babur before subsequently forming a political alliance through marriage. Shaheed later married a niece of Emperor Humayun, identified as the daughter of Pir Haibat of Kandahar. Accounts state that events connected to these political and familial relationships ultimately led to his death during the reign of Akbar. He exercised authority over the districts of Bhimber, Mirpur, and Nowshera, within the territory of the former Jammu and Kashmir. In consideration of his services rendered to the Emperor Akbar in Kandahar, he was made Governor of Kashmir with the title of Shadab Khan. He also served as governor of Kandahar during Akbar's reign. His tribe, the Chib Rajputs of Kashmir, come to his shrine in Jandi Chontra in Bhimber to pay their respects and ritualistically celebrate the births of their children. In the last few decades, the popularity of the shrine has grown among non-tribe members due to the belief that visiting the shrine will help childless couples to bear children.

Sadip Chand, adopted the Muhammadan faith in the Court of the Emperor Babur, and was confirmed by that monarch in his possessions, taking the name of Shadab Khan. This Chief accompanied the Emperor Humayun on many of his expeditions, and was at length killed in a quarrel.

There are two different shrines to him, one in Pakistan honouring him by his Islamic name and one in India honouring him by his Hindu birth name. He is widely considered by many to be the greatest chief of the Chibh dynasty, and locals refer to Raja Shadab Khan as The “Mahaa Raja” (Literally meaning: The Great King), but he is not called Maharaja Shadab Khan (where maharaja might be considered an inflated title).

Originally Rajput, the ruling family embraced Islam at a later date which is uncertain, but probably not later than the time of Babur, from whom the head of the family, named Shadi, is said to have received a confirmation for his possessions. He is said to have accompanied Humayun on some of his expeditions, and was finally killed by one, Pir Haibat, of Kandahar, and has ever since been venerated as a saint. His tomb is near the town of Bhimber, and is a place of pilgrimage to which the local Pahari Chib Rajputs go to. The shrine is called Sur Sadi Shahid. At his shrine every Chib child must be presented on attaining a certain age, so that the lock of hair, specially retained for the purpose, may be cut off with much ceremony; without this he cannot become a true Chib.
