= Khan Klub =

Hotel in Peshawar, Pakistan

Khan Klub is a boutique hotel in Peshawar, Pakistan.

== History ==
The hotel is housed in a restored Hindu haveli that was built in 1793 by the Howrah family and is owned by Bashir Ahmed Awan. It was opened on November 3, 1995 by Irish-American Martin Jay Davis (known as Ashley), who designed and spent one year renovating the haveli with 76 refugee master artisans from Afghanistan. All fixtures, furniture and artwork were produced by Afghan refugees and Pakistani craftsmen. The haveli was restored by Davis in order to promote cultural understanding in Peshawar of the importance of heritage preservation and the promotion of the arts. Davis spent 13 years in Peshawar (between 1990-2003) promoting and preserving the arts of Afghanistan and Pakistan's Khyber Pakhtunkhwa province.

There are 8 rooms in the hotel, each named after gemstones mined in Afghanistan and Pakistan: lapis lazuli, spinel, morganite, tourmaline, topaz, peridot, ruby, and garnet. The restaurant is designed on the pattern of a traditional Pashtun hujra with traditional bajotes (small sitting level dining tables), filigreed brass lanterns, garnet floors and handmade carpets. Lapis room has genuine lapis lazuli tiles that were made by the celebrated Afghan jeweler, the late Naib-ud-din. The library and all public rooms are tiled with almandine garnet in marble. Morganite room is tiled in morganite crystals imbedded in marble. The entrance doors to the Khan Klub and guest rooms have original stained glass windows that were produced in Murshidabad (India) in the late 18th Century. The main structure of the hotel, as well as carved jharokas (decorative façades) and jalis (filigreed panels), are also made from wood of giant Himalayan cedar.
