= Mangla Fort =

Ancient fort in Mirpur, Azad Kashmir

Coordinates: 33.1304°N 73.6416°E

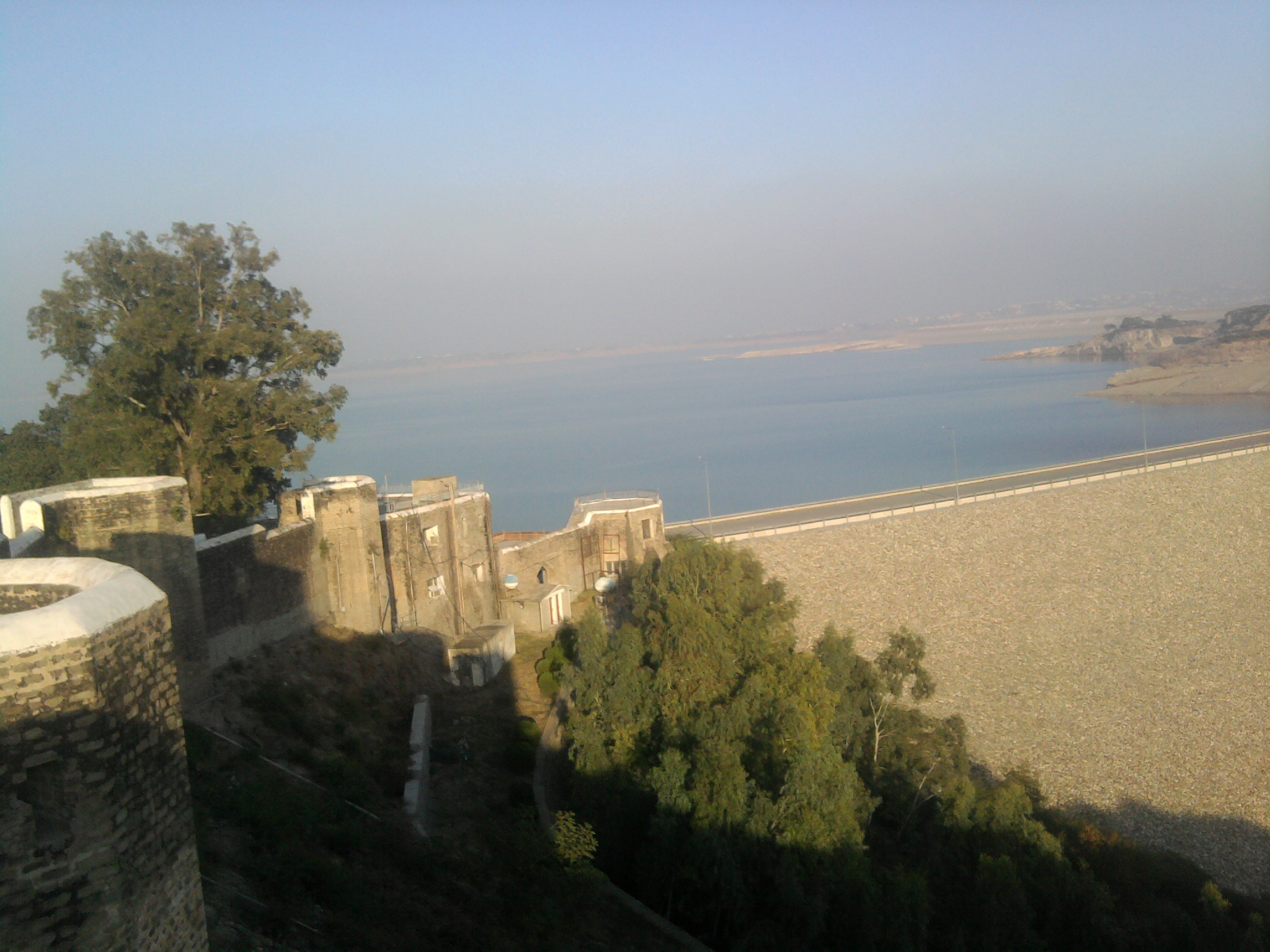
- View of Mangla Fort
- Interactive map of the Mangla Fort area

General information
- Location: Mangla, Mirpur district, Azad Jammu and Kashmir
- Construction started: Anno Domini

Mangla Fort (Urdu: منگلا قلعہ) is a historical fort located in Mangla, Azad Kashmir. It is currently under the administration of the Pakistan Army and is not publicly accessible.

During the construction of the Mangla Dam, a large portion of the fort was submersed in the dam. Presently, only about five to six acres of the southwestern part remain above water.

== History ==
Established before the common era on the hills adjacent to the Jhelum River, the fort signifies the geographical and historical demarcation known as the Gateway to Kashmir, where the Jhelum River delineates the border between Punjab and Azad Kashmir.

The fort's initial structure was composed of mud and stones, with subsequent enhancements made by the Gakhars during the early Mughal period, including the addition of decorative arches. Its construction utilized materials such as sandy stones, stone sketches, and large wooden beams, with carved stones of varying lengths, and some areas featuring limestone.

== Overview ==
The site encompasses a 100-square-mile lake and the Mangla Dam, significant for its role in hydro-electrical power generation. The river's water sources include the Vari Nag Fountain and Wular Lake in the Himalayas of Kashmir. The construction of the dam, aligned with the provisions of the Indus Waters Treaty, was a notable development in the region. The area also includes an army garrison and is known for its local freshwater fish, especially the Mahasher, from Mangla Lake and the Jhelum River.

=== Building of the fort ===
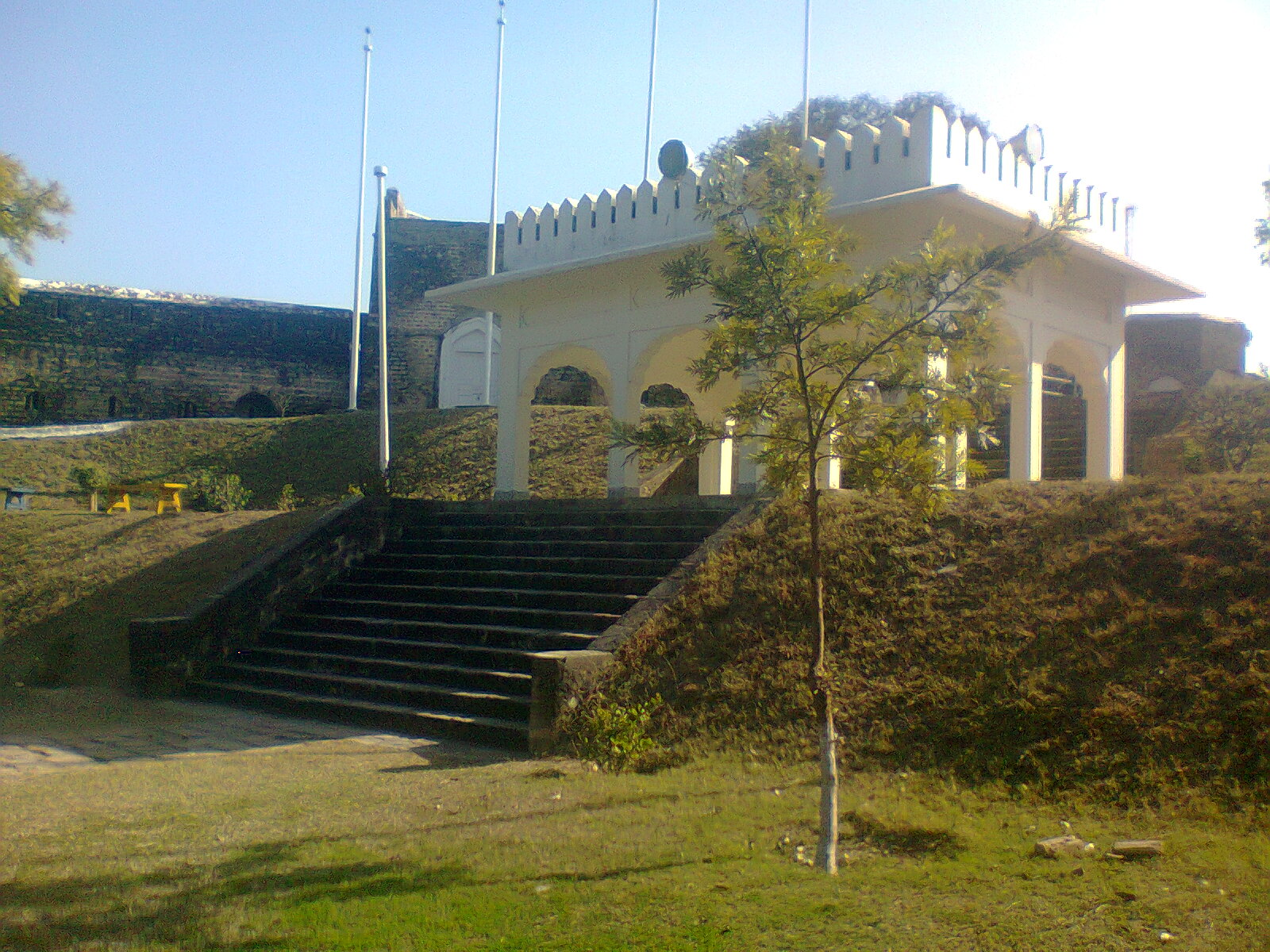
Baradari of the fort

The layout of the fort includes a main entrance gate leading to a divided pathway. The right path directs visitors to the western rampart, marked by grassy areas and flower beds. Opposite the rampart lies a deep ditch. The left path from the gate leads to an arched veranda atop which the Water and Power Development Authority (WAPDA) has constructed a room.

From this veranda, nearby power house, WAPDA's rest house, and offices are visible, along with a distant view of the Upper Jhelum Canal. In proximity to the veranda is an old tree, near which are several rooms, one of which functions as a museum. This museum displays items found during the construction of the Mangla Dam and features related to the power house design.

== Architecture ==
The fort's design included defensive elements like elongated wall holes for surveillance and protection. The original roofs of the fort have not survived, and significant internal modifications were made by the Water and Power Development Authority (WAPDA) during the dam's construction. The fort's eastern and southern walls were higher than those on the north and west, indicating varied defensive strategies.
