= Bhimber =

Town in Pakistan administered Kashmir

Bhimber بھمبر
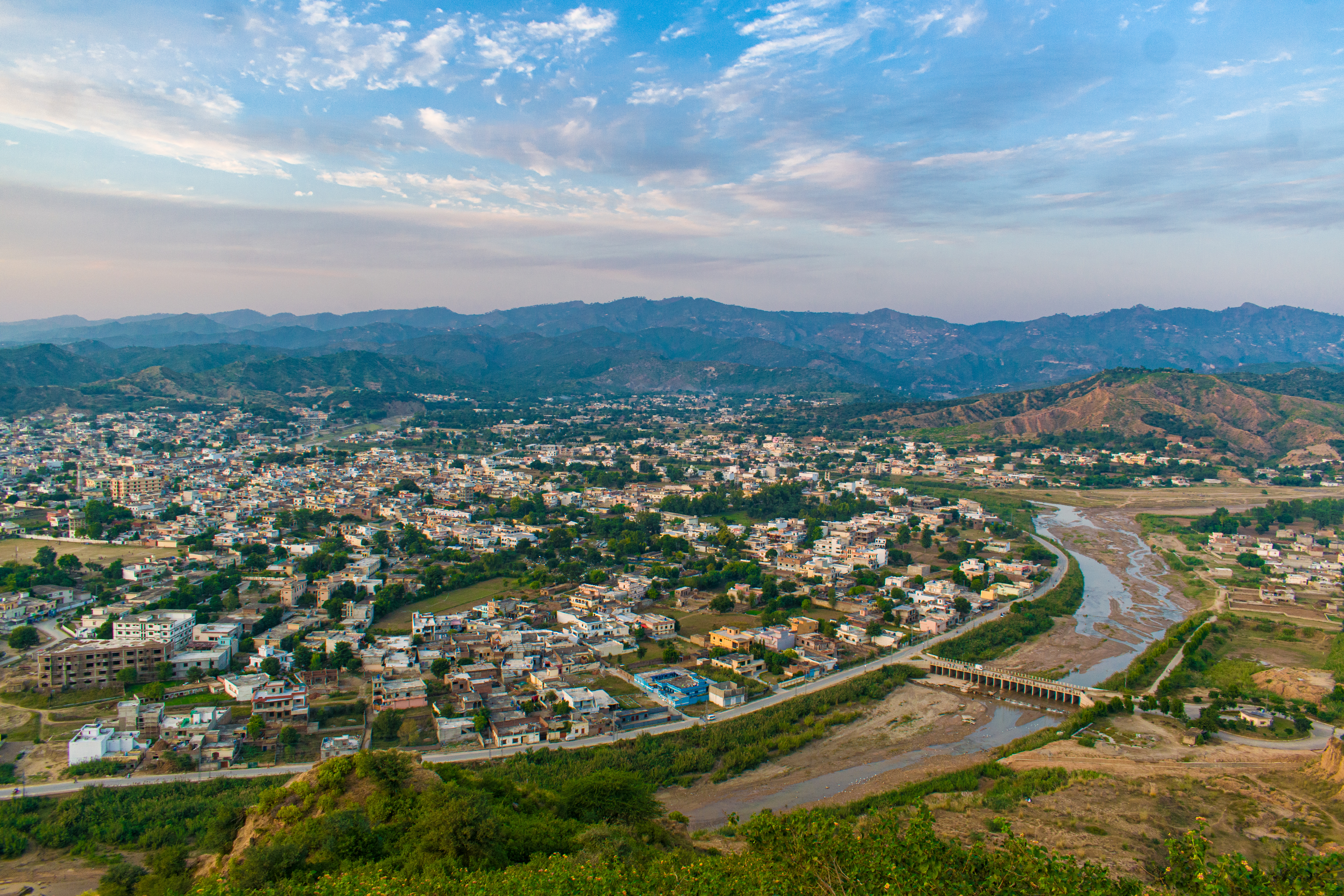
- Bhimber City

- Location within Azad Kashmir Location within Pakistan
- Coordinates: 32°58′29″N 74°04′23″E
- Administering country: Pakistan
- Dependent Territory: Azad Kashmir
- District: Bhimber

Government
  - Chairman Municipal Corporation: Ch. Altaf Ibrahim
  - Deputy Commissioner: Arshad Mehmood Jarral

Population (2017)
  - Total: 27,636
- Time zone: UTC+5 (PST)
- Postal code: 10040
- Dialling code: 0092-05828
- Website: Official Website

Bhimber (Urdu: بھمبر) is a town and the headquarters of the eponymous district in Pakistan-administered Azad Kashmir. The town and district are between the Jammu region of Indian-administered Kashmir and Pakistan proper, about 47 km (29 mi) by road southeast of Mirpur.

== History ==
Bhimber was the capital of the Chibhal dynasty, which lasted from 1400 to 1856.

In 1486, Raja Howns (probably Hans) of Bhimber defeated a force from the Punjab that attempted to enter through Bhimber.

Bhimber was listed in the Ain-i Akbari (c. 1595) as a mahal under Lahore Subah, counted as part of the Jech Doab. It was listed with an assessed revenue of 1,200,000 dams and was not listed as supplying any troops to the Mughal army.

Bhimber lies on the route that was followed by the Mughal emperors during their frequent visits to the Kashmir Valley. It is also known as "Baab-e-Kashmir" (Door to Kashmir) because of its importance and geographical location, which made it suitable for the Mughal emperors to enter Kashmir. Therefore, the Mughals used Bhimber as a staging point for their journey to Srinagar. The Mughal emperor Jahangir mentions Bhimber in his book Tuzk-e-Jahangiri.

Bhimber is also mentioned on page 19 of the Atlas Maior, published in 1665 by Joan Blaeu, a Dutch cartographer.

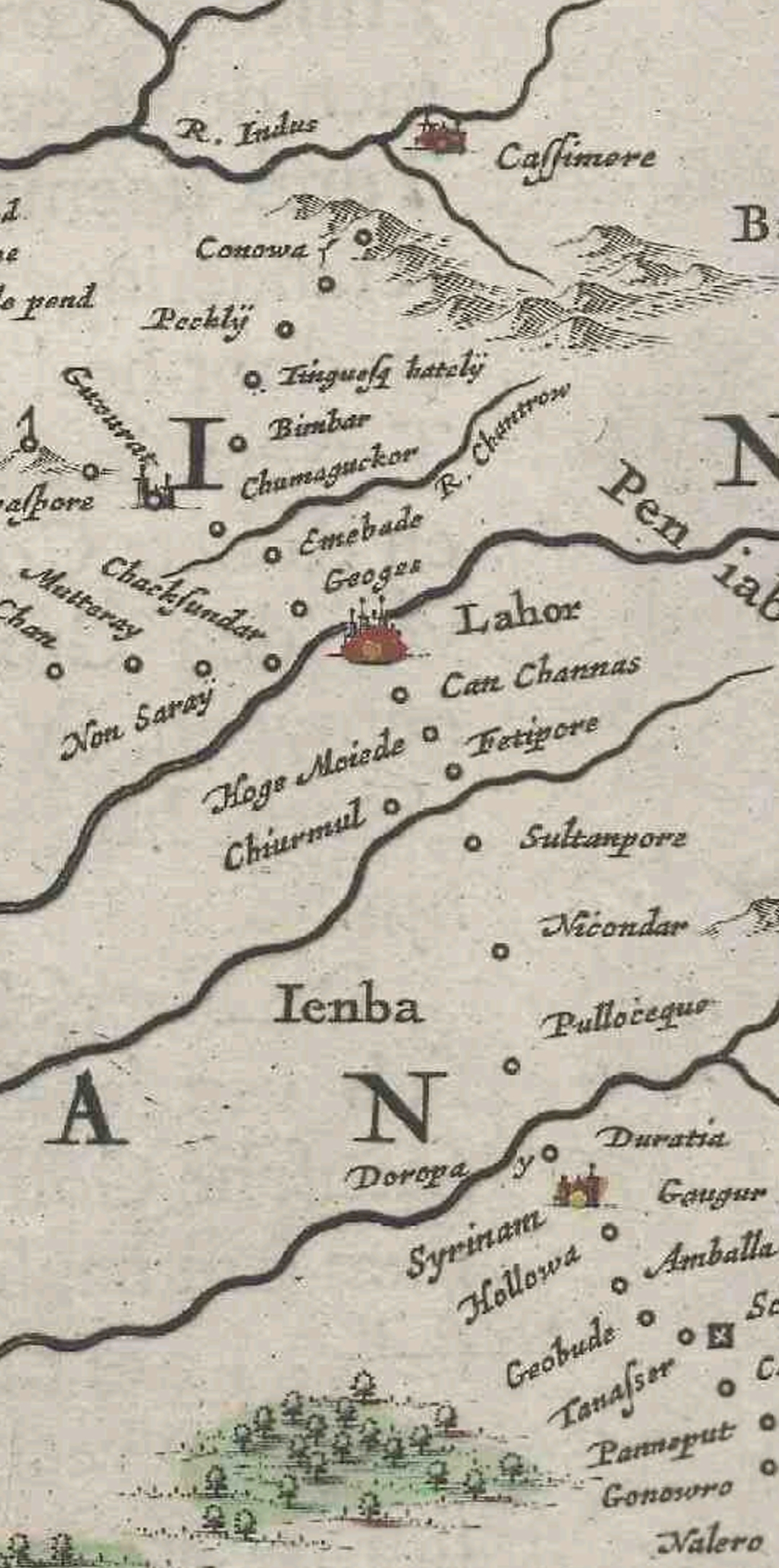
"Bhimbar in Atlas Maior"

=== Modern history ===
In the 19th century, Chibhal came under the Maharaja Gulab Singh. Around 1822, along with Poonch, it was granted as a jagir (feudal land grant) to Raja Dhian Singh of the Dogra dynasty, Gulab Singh's brother. After the death of Maharaja Ranjit Singh, the Sikh court fell into disunity, and Dhian Singh was murdered in court intrigue. Subsequently, the princely state of Jammu and Kashmir was formed under the suzerainty of the British Empire, and these territories were transferred to Jammu and Kashmir. The jagir given to Dhian Singh was respected, however, and Dhian Singh's sons Moti Singh and Jawahir Singh were retained as their Rajas.

In 1852, the brothers Jawahir and Moti Singh quarrelled, and the Punjab Board of Revenue awarded a settlement. Moti Singh was awarded the Poonch district, and Jawahir Singh was awarded Bhimber, Mirpur and Kotli. In 1859, Jawahir Singh was accused of 'treacherous conspiracy' by Maharaja Ranbir Singh (r. 1857–1885), who succeeded Gulab Singh. The British agreed with the assessment and forced Jawahir Singh to exile in Ambala. Ranbir Singh paid Jawahir Singh an annual stipend of Rs. 100,000 until his death, and appropriated his territory afterwards because Jawahir Singh had no heirs.

The appropriated territory was organised as the Bhimber district (wazarat) in 1860. In the decade preceding 1911, the district headquarters was shifted to Mirpur and it came to be called the Mirpur district. Bhimber remained a tehsil headquarters until 1947. It had a Hindu majority population, mostly consisting of Mahajans.

== Geography and climate ==
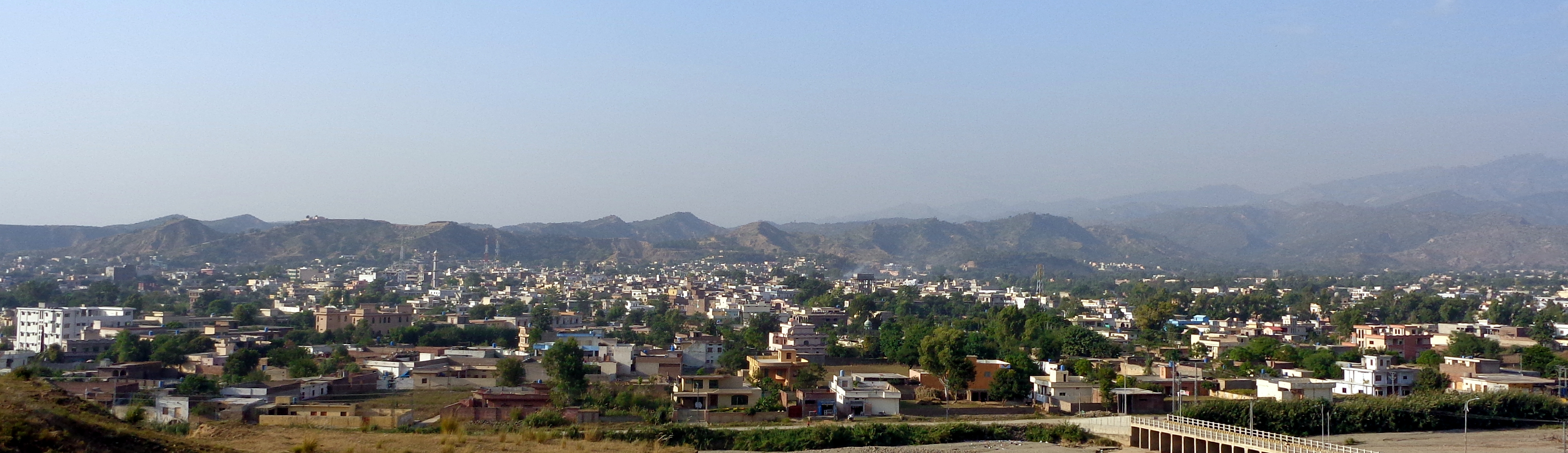
Panoramic view of Bhimber

Bhimber is a valley. Its hot, subhumid climate and other geographical conditions closely resemble those of Gujrat, the adjoining district in Punjab.

The climate in Bhimber is classified as warm and temperate. Summers have a good deal of rainfall; winters have much less. This location is classified as Cwa by Köppen. The average annual temperature is 23.6 °C (74.5 °F) with a yearly average rainfall of 974 mm (38.3 in). July and August are the wettest months. Temperatures are highest in June.

Climate data for Bhimber, elevation: 325 m (1,066 ft)
Month	Jan	Feb	Mar	Apr	May	Jun	Jul	Aug	Sep	Oct	Nov	Dec	Year
Mean daily maximum °C (°F)	18.7 (65.7)	21.6 (70.9)	26.9 (80.4)	33.1 (91.6)	38.5 (101.3)	40.6 (105.1)	36.2 (97.2)	34.3 (93.7)	34.9 (94.8)	32.7 (90.9)	26.7 (80.1)	21 (70)	30.4 (86.8)
Daily mean °C (°F)	12.2 (54.0)	14.9 (58.8)	20 (68)	25.6 (78.1)	30.7 (87.3)	33.5 (92.3)	31.2 (88.2)	29.8 (85.6)	29.1 (84.4)	24.9 (76.8)	18.3 (64.9)	13.4 (56.1)	23.6 (74.5)
Mean daily minimum °C (°F)	5.7 (42.3)	8.2 (46.8)	13.1 (55.6)	18.2 (64.8)	23 (73)	26.5 (79.7)	26.3 (79.3)	25.4 (77.7)	23.3 (73.9)	17.1 (62.8)	10 (50)	5.9 (42.6)	16.9 (62.4)
Average rainfall mm (inches)	54 (2.1)	56 (2.2)	57 (2.2)	30 (1.2)	26 (1.0)	52 (2.0)	258 (10.2)	272 (10.7)	112 (4.4)	21 (0.8)	12 (0.5)	24 (0.9)	974 (38.2)
Source: Climate-Data.org

== Notable people ==
- Chaudhry Anwarul Haq — 15th Prime Minister of Azad Kashmir
- Raja Muhammad Zulqarnain Khan — politician, ex-President of Azad Jammu and Kashmir
- Manzoor Mirza — economist
- Brig. Ret.Habib ur Rahman — (1913-1978) Ex Indian National Army
- Ghulam Rasul Raja — Pakistan Army officer
- Baba Shadi Shaheed — Sufi saint who fought against the Sikhs

== Bibliography ==
- Bamzai, P. N. K. (1994), Culture and Political History of Kashmir, M.D. Publications Pvt. Ltd., ISBN 978-81-85880-31-0, archived from the original on 6 July 2017
- Effendi, Col. M. Y. (2007), Punjab Cavalry: Evolution, Role, Organisation and Tactical Doctrine 11 Cavalry, Frontier Force, 1849-1971, Karachi: Oxford University Press, ISBN 978-0-19-547203-5, archived from the original on 8 June 2020
- Huttenback, Robert A. (1961), "Gulab Singh and the Creation of the Dogra State of Jammu, Kashmir, and Ladakh" (PDF), The Journal of Asian Studies, 20 (4): 477–488, doi:10.2307/2049956, JSTOR 2049956, archived from the original (PDF) on 15 August 2016
- Panikkar, K. M. (1930). Gulab Singh. London: Martin Hopkinson Ltd.
- Raghavan, Srinath (2010), War and Peace in Modern India, Palgrave Macmillan, pp. 101–, ISBN 978-1-137-00737-7, archived from the original on 19 August 2019
- Rai, Mridu (2004), Hindu Rulers, Muslim Subjects: Islam, Rights, and the History of Kashmir, C. Hurst & Co, ISBN 1850656614, archived from the original on 4 September 2021
- Schofield, Victoria (2003) [First published in 2000], Kashmir in Conflict, London and New York: I. B. Taurus & Co, ISBN 1860648983
- Saraf, Muhammad Yusuf (1977), Kashmiris Fight for Freedom: 1819-1946, Lahore: Ferozsons, p. 238, LCCN 78930778, archived from the original on 16 March 2017
- Singh, Bawa Satinder (1971), "Raja Gulab Singh's Role in the First Anglo-Sikh War", Modern Asian Studies, 5 (1): 35–59, doi:10.1017/s0026749x00002845, JSTOR 311654
- Singh, K. Brahma (2010) [first published Lancer International 1990], History of Jammu and Kashmir Rifles, 1820-1956: The State Force Background (PDF), brahmasingh.co.nf, ISBN 978-81-7062-091-4, archived from the original (PDF) on 6 March 2016
- Snedden, Christopher (2013) [first published as The Untold Story of the People of Azad Kashmir, 2012], Kashmir: The Unwritten History, HarperCollins India, ISBN 978-9350298985, archived from the original on 2 February 2020
- Zaheer, Hasan (1998), The Times and Trial of the Rawalpindi Conspiracy, 1951: The First Coup Attempt in Pakistan, Oxford University Press, ISBN 978-0-19-577892-2, archived from the original on 14 March 2017
