= Bhimber District =

District in Azad Kashmir, Pakistan

Bhimber District ضلع بھمبر
- District of Azad Kashmir administered by Pakistan
- Bhimber
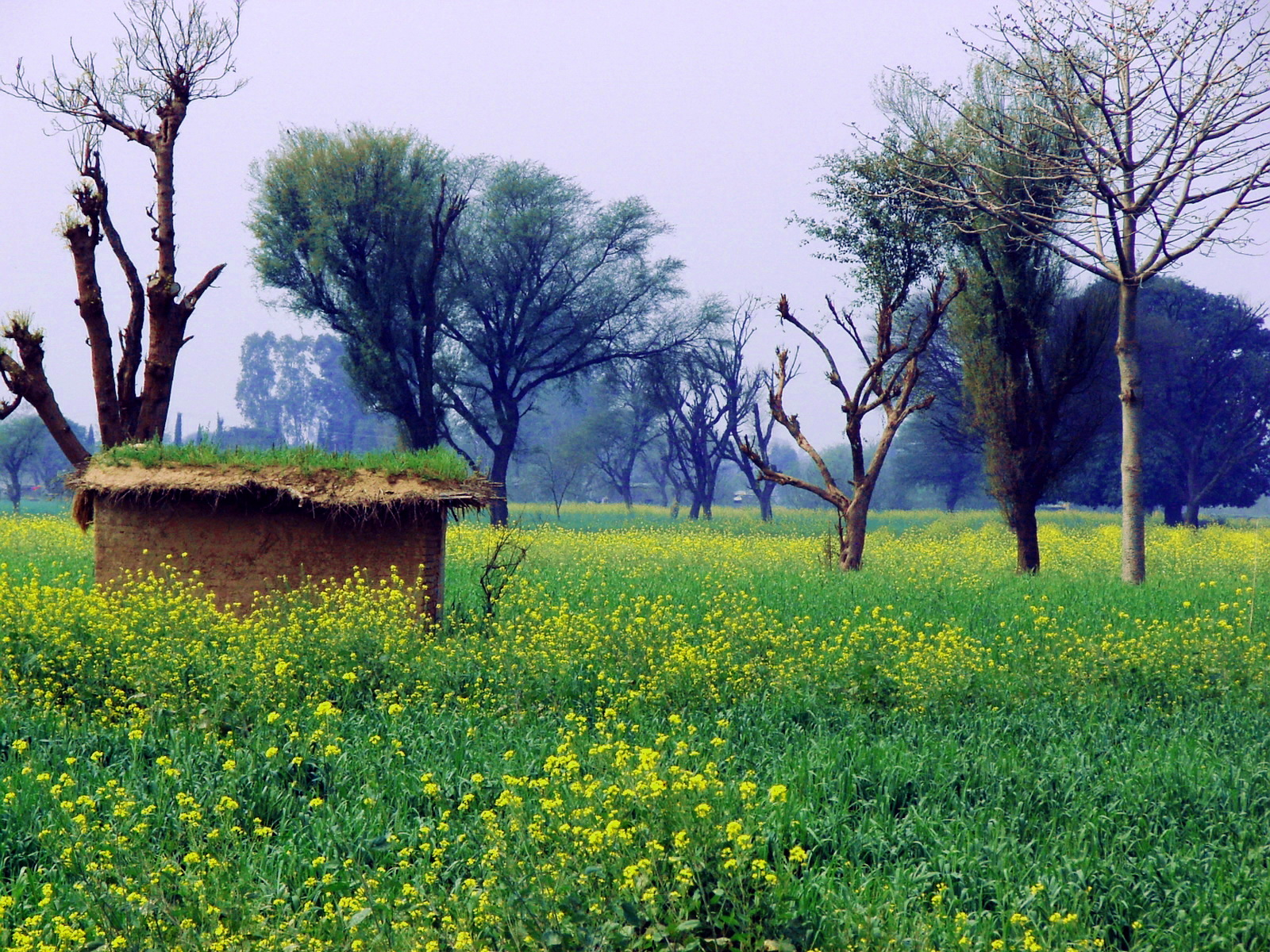
- Rural scene in Bhimber District

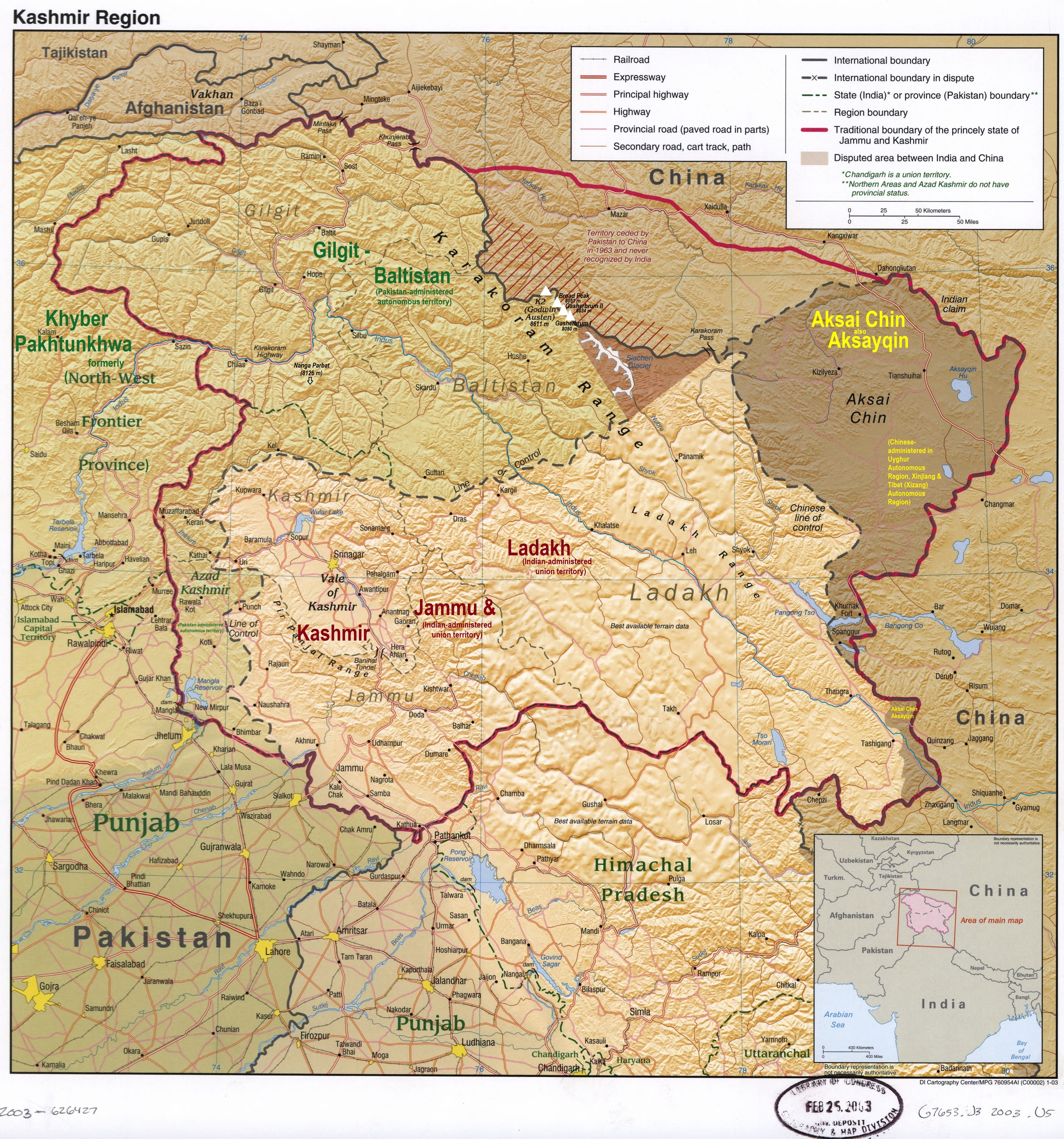
- A map showing Pakistani-administered Azad Kashmir (shaded in sage green) in the disputed Kashmir region
- Interactive map of Bhimber District
- Coordinates (Bhimber): 33°00′N 74°06′E
- Administering country: Pakistan
- Territory: Azad Kashmir
- Division: Mirpur Division
- Headquarters: Bhimber

Government
  - Type: District Administration
  - Deputy Commissioner: Ch Muhammad Tariq
  - District Police Officer: Ch Muhammad Amin
  - District Health Officer: Dr. Imran Sajid

Area
  - Total: 1,516 km^{2} (585 sq mi)

Population (2017)
  - Total: 420,624
  - Density: 277/km^{2} (720/sq mi)

Languages
  - Official: Urdu
  - Spoken: Punjabi, Pahari, Dogri, Gujari
- Number of Tehsils: 3

Bhimber District (Urdu: ضلع بھمبر) is a district of Pakistan-administered Azad Kashmir in the disputed Kashmir region. It is the southernmost of the 10 districts of Pakistan's territory of Azad Kashmir. It has an area of 1,516 km², and the district headquarter is the town of Bhimber.

Map of Azad Kashmir with the Bhimber District highlighted in red

== History ==
Bhimber was the Capital of the Chib dynasty which lasted from 1400 to 1846.The area is rich in archeological remains due to its strategic location on the route that was followed by the Mughal emperors on their frequent visits to the Kashmir Valley.

It is strategically important from defense and military standpoint. Due to its location, it became known as the Gateway to Kashmir (Bab-e-Kashmir).

During the 1947 Poonch rebellion and subsequent Indo-Pakistani War of 1947–1948 Bhimber was captured by the Azad Kashmir rebels supported by Pakistan and became a part of the Azad Kashmir.

Previously, Bhimber was a tehsil of the Mirpur District but was elevated to district status in 1996.

== Demographics ==
According to the 2017 census, the population of the district is 420,624.

=== Social groups ===
Punjabi, Pahari, Dogras and Gujjars are the main groups/tribes of the Bhimber district. Other social groups in the district are Rajput, Jat, Mirza and Mughal.

=== Language ===
The main native languages are Punjabi (spoken by 35% of the population), Pahari (Mirpuri) (30%), Dogri (30%) and Gujari (5%). Urdu language has 'official' status.

1. Punjabi (35.0%)
2. Dogri (30.0%)
3. Pahari (Mirpuri) (30.0%)
4. Gujari (5.00%)

== Location ==
The Bhimber District is bounded on the north by the Kotli District, on the east by the Rajouri District and the Jammu District of Indian-administered Jammu and Kashmir, on the south by the Gujrat District of Pakistan's Punjab Province, and on the west by the Mirpur District. The town of Bhimber is 50 km from the city of Mirpur.

== Administrative divisions ==
The Bhimber District is subdivided into three tehsils:

- Barnala Tehsil
- Bhimber Tehsil
- Samahni Tehsil
- kalri Tehsil

== Education ==
According to the Alif Ailaan Pakistan District Education Rankings 2015, the Bhimber District ranked 10th out of 145 districts in Pakistan and its two dependent territories in terms of education. For facilities and infrastructure, the district ranked 116 out of 145.

== Climate ==
The southern zone of the Mirpur Division has a climate similar to the neighbouring areas of the Punjab province. Hot summer temperatures are often over 45 C from May to September. Winters are cold, and rainfall is concentrated in the monsoon season from late June to the end of August. There is often a prolonged dry period from October to early January, followed by winter rains from mid-January to March.
