= Sakhial =

A Muslim tribe, found mainly in Mirpur District of Azad Kashmir. The own a group of villages including Kathar Dilawar in Dadyal, Mirpur District.

== See also ==
- Azad Kashmir
- Ethnic Groups of Azad Kashmir
