= Abdupur =

Village in Pakistan

Coordinates: 33°02′N 73°49′E

Abdupur is a village in Mirpur Tehsil of Mirpur District of Azad Kashmir, Pakistan, not far from the town of Jatlan. According to the 1998 census of Pakistan, its population was 1,027. Like many other villages in the Mirpur region, many of its residents have emigrated to the United Kingdom.
