= Chitterpari =

Chitterpari چترپڑی
- Town
- Location in Azad Kashmir Chitterpari (Pakistan)
- Coordinates: 33.129182°N 73.694821°E
- Country: Pakistan
- Territory: Azad Kashmir
- District: Mirpur
- Tehsil: Mirpur

Area
  - Total: 6 km^{2} (2.3 sq mi)

Population
  - Total: 30,000
  - Density: 5,000/km^{2} (13,000/sq mi)
- Time zone: UTC+5 (PST)

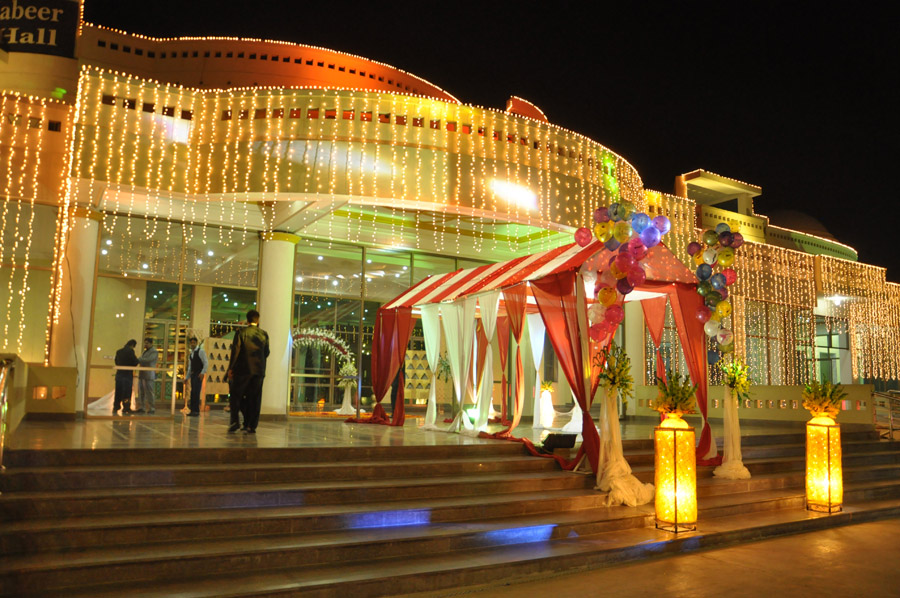
Gulshin e Jabeer, Chitterpari

Chitterpari (Chittar Pari) (Pothwari / Urdu: چترپڑی) is a rapidly expanding town situated near Mirpur, in the state of Azad Kashmir in Pakistan. Its population is nearly 30,000. Chitterpari is located in the northern Pothohar Plateau of the Punjab region, about 6 kilometres (3.7 mi) west-southwest of Mirpur, 95 kilometres (59 mi) north-northwest of Islamabad, and 1,000 kilometres (620 mi) northeast of Karachi. Its climate is quite hot during the summer, from July to September. The town lies on the south shores of Mangla Lake, an artificial lake created by the Mangla Dam on the Jhelum River in the 1960s. This town is divided in muhallas (mini towns) Muhalla Barban, Muhalla Gorsian, Muhalla Munda, Muhalla Nagyal, Muhalla Khambal, Muhalla Mahajar etc.

It has the Markazi Jamia Masjid that can be seen from the top of Mangla Dam. The first medical college of Azad Kashmir known as Mohtarma Benazir Bhutto Shaheed Medical College is located in this town.
