= Mohra Malkan =

- Location within Azad Kashmir
- Coordinates: 33°19′N 73°42′E
- Country: Pakistan
- Province: Azad Kashmir

Population
  - Estimate: 3,152
- Time zone: UTC+5 (PST)

Mohra Malkan is a village in the Dadyal Tehsil of Mirpur District of Azad Kashmir. Mohra Malkan is about 42 mi (68 km) southeast of Islamabad. Mohra Malkan is part of the Union Council of Amb. It is located approximately 2 km from Dadyal City; on the edge of Mangla Dam and next to the ruins/remains of Old Dadyal City. Other villages around Mohra Malkan are Chapman and Mehra.
