= Siakh Pahaith =

Village in Azad Kashmir, Pakistan

Siakh is a village in Dadyal Tehsil of Mirpur District of Azad Kashmir, Pakistan. It has recently become an area of interest to Chinese investors the villages is powered by the hydroelectric power produced by the Mangla Dam. It can be reached by going through other satellite towns like Chaksawari and Dadyal.

== Demography ==
According to the 2024 census of Pakistan, its population was 3670 which includes overseas residents.

== History ==
Like many villages in the Mirpur region, many villagers have emigrated to the United Kingdom and have settled mainly in the City of Birmingham and the Town of Blackburn as well as surrounding areas. The Gakhar/Kiyani (Raja), Jats, Mughals, and the Qazi castes make up the bulk of its population.

A historic village in Mirpur district with stunning views of the Mangla Dam, the original settlement was submerged under the dam's waters in the mid-1960s. The new village was reconstructed approximately 1.5 kilometres west, on the hills of Pel Bakhshi Moti Ram. Historically, many Hindus lived in the old village for centuries, however had to leave the village and settle elsewhere in India due to the partition in 1947. A Hindu temple still remains in the old village and when the Mangla Dam water decreases during the year, parts of the temple can be seen. The Jat Caste in Siakh are historically from Multan and have settled in the village for centuries. They live towards the main Siakh road and own most of the agricultural land which remains in the village. The Ghakars/Kiyani Rajput caste have always lived in Siakh for centuries. They were the tribal rulers of the old village under the British Raj. The Mughal caste are originally from Delhi, India and had escaped leaving their properties and wealth into the mountains in Kashmir when the Mughal rule in India came to an end. They finally settled in Siakh in 1865, 7 years after the Indian rebellion and worked as skilled builders, carpenters & blacksmiths.

== Industry ==
The village's economy is primarily rooted in agriculture, producing fruits such as guavas, limes, and pomegranates, with mangoes being particularly popular.
