= Mehmunpur =

Coordinates: 33°03′N 73°47′E

Mehmunpur Rajgan is a village near Jatlan, Mirpur District, Azad Kashmir, Pakistan.

The village is situated between Jhelum River and the Upper Jhelum Canal, 15 km from Mirpur city. The village was established by one Raja Kamal Khan who moved from village Sahang. The inhabitants of the village are Panwar Sohlan Rajputs. The notables of village included Subadar Raja Muhammad Zaman Military Cross WW1 (Late), Zaildar Raja Sajjawal Khan (Late), Zaildar Raja Bashir Ahmed Khan (Late), Raja Manzoor Ahmed Khan (Late), Captain Raja Sultan Akbar Ali Khan (Late) and many others who have done valuable services for the State and society.

== Demography ==
According to 1998 census of Pakistan, its population was 232.
