= Chattroh =

Village in Azad Kashmir, Pakistan

Chattroh is a small village in the Dadyal tehsil in Azad Kashmir, Mirpur District, Pakistan.

Like much of Mirpur, Chattroh has deep connections with the UK. Many people originally from Chattroh have settled in urban centres of the UK such as Birmingham, Manchester, Coventry, slough and also Rotherham. The Cheetham Hill district of Manchester is often referred to as 'New Chattroh' , reflecting the fact that a large number of people from Chhatroh live there. The town of Rochdale in Greater Manchester also has a large number of people from Chattroh residing in it. The link with the UK is immediately obvious upon entering Chhatroh, where one is greeted by palatial, hacienda-style residences, eerily empty, which have been built with remitted UK incomes. In this regard, Chattroh is no different from the rest of the Mirpur District, where links with the UK have precipitated various property booms since the 1960s. There are four major castes living in Chattroh – Jatt's, Mughals, Chaudhary, and Raja's.

Chattroh meets the Jhelum River at its west end. There are fields of ankar at the north end of its geographical boundary. Chattroh is covered with hills covered with trees from east to southwest until Jhelum. River meets.

== Demography ==
In the Census of India 1941, it was recorded (as Chhatroh) as having 459 occupied houses, and a total population of 1903 which had increased from 1685 in 1931. Of the population 927 were male and 976 female. In terms of religion, all of the population except 6 males were Muslims.

According to the 1998 census of Pakistan, the population of Chhatroh was 3,191.

== History ==
When the Mangla Dam was created in the 1960s, Chhatroh escaped relatively unscathed, with only land on the periphery affected. However, plans to raise the Mangla reservoir further, if implemented, are certain to affect properties in Chhatroh. These plans, as well as the general property boom, have contributed to demand for habitable land This, in turn, has encouraged many unscrupulous people to take advantage of the archaic land laws and registers to make unmeritorious claims to premium land.

== Politics ==
Chhatroh also has a long history of involvement in politics. Ch Abbas Ali, Mirpur's representative to the assembly of Maharaja Hari Singh, the last Dogra ruler of Kashmir, was from Chhatroh. In recent years, two MPs for the Dadyal constituency of the state government have hailed from Chhatroh, both of whom also served as State Ministers. Choudhry Ali Mohammad Chacha, the ex-Minister of Law of Azad Kashmir who was assassinated in Mirpur in March 2008 was from Chhatroh. Now the agriculture minister of Azad Kashmir is Chaudhary Masood Khalid. In office from 2016. He is a native of Chattroh.
