= 2019 Kashmir earthquake =

Earthquake in Kashmir

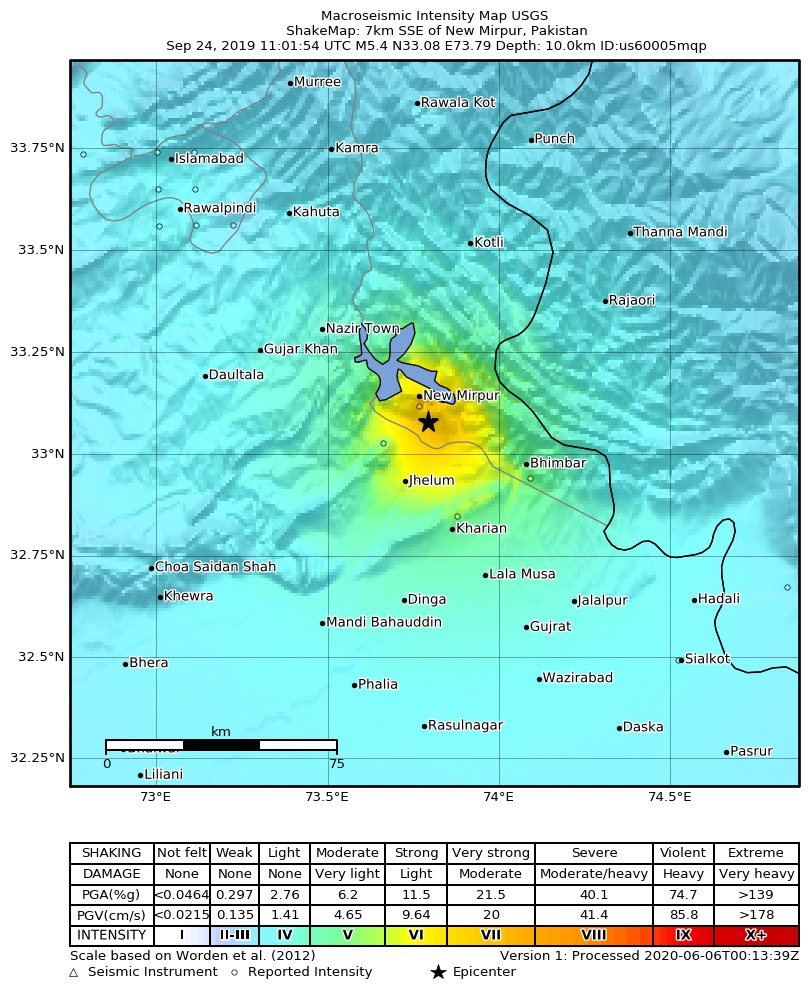

- Location within Pakistan
- UTC time: 2019-09-24 11:01:55
- ISC event: 616494857
- USGS-ANSS: ComCat
- Local date: 24 September 2019
- Local time: 16:02 Pakistan Standard Time
- Magnitude: 5.4 M_{ww} 6.0 M_{w}
- Depth: 10 km (6.2 mi)
- Epicenter: 33.106°N 73.766°E
- Type: Thrust
- Areas affected: Pakistan
- Max. intensity: MMI VII (Very strong); EMS-98 VIII (Heavily damaging)
- Casualties: 40 dead, 850 injured

The 2019 Kashmir earthquake struck regions of Pakistan with an epicentre in Azad Kashmir on 24 September at 16:02 local time (11:02 UTC). It had a magnitude of 5.4 M_{ww} and a maximum felt intensity of VII (Very strong) on the Modified Mercalli intensity scale or VIII (Heavily damaging) on the European macroseismic scale. There was severe damage in Mirpur District, causing the deaths of 40 people and injuring a further 850. The epicentre of the shallow quake was near the city of Mirpur, Pakistan. The tremors were felt in the Kashmir region, Punjab (Pakistan), Punjab (India), Uttarakhand and northern parts of India including New Delhi.

== Tectonic setting ==
Kashmir lies at the southern margin of the broad zone of continental collision between the Eurasian and Indian plates. The rate of convergence between these plates near this location is 38 mm per year. The main structures involved in accommodating this convergence are large thrust faults, such as the Main Central Thrust and the Main Frontal Thrust. Within the frontal thrust zone, there are many individual thrust faults. Many damaging earthquakes have resulted from movement on such thrust faults, such as the 2005 Kashmir earthquake which caused the deaths of around 87,000 people.

== Earthquake ==
The earthquake, which occurred at a depth of 10 km, was the result of thrust faulting associated with the active convergent boundary. Further analysis has shown that it occurred on a near horizontal-dipping thrust fault on the interface of the plate boundary. The Main Himalayan Thrust; the décollement structure underlying the Himalayas was the source of the earthquake. The rupture occurred on a segment of the décollement where it branches up to the surface via the Main Frontal Thrust. Up to 0.4 meter of slip occurred during the event, releasing a fraction of energy accumulated since a large quake in 1555. Modelling of the earthquake with InSAR data indicated a moment magnitude of 6.0.

== Damage ==
The earthquake caused severe damage to 135 houses in Mirpur District, with a further 319 being partially damaged, most in Mirpur and just four in Bhimber District. Two bridges were reported damaged and parts of several roads were affected, particularly 14 km of the Main Jatlan Road.

According to the chairman of Pakistan's National Disaster Management Authority (NDMA), "In Mirpur, besides the city, a small town Jatlan, and two small villages Manda and Afzalpur" were among the worst-hit areas. According to him, the main road which runs alongside a river from Mangla to Jatlan suffered major damage. According to the officials, the Mangla Dam, Pakistan's major water reservoir, was spared. However, the dam's power house was closed, which resulted in a loss of 900 megawatts to Pakistan's national power grid. At 7:20 pm, power generation at Mangla was resumed, restoring 700 MW to the national grid.

According to a media report, cracks and fissures had appeared in the Upper Jhelum canal. Flood water had managed to enter the Chak Nigah village in Jatlan town. The canal was subsequently shut as a precautionary measure.

== Casualties ==
Forty people have died and more than 850 injured as per the reports published on 26 September. Of those who died, thirty-three were in Mirpur District, four in Bhimber District, and one more in Jhelum District. Reuters reported, citing architects, that the large number of casualties were due to shoddy building construction methods and weak construction standards in Pakistan. Mirpur's deputy inspector general of police Sardar Gulfaraz Khan stated that a large number of deaths were caused due to the collapse of old houses in the villages.

== Response ==
The Prime Minister of Azad Jammu and Kashmir, Farooq Haider Khan, cut short a visit to Lahore and went back to his native region immediately after the reports of the damage emerged. NDMA vehicles laden with 200 tents, 800 blankets, 200 kitchen sets and 100 medical kits were dispatched to affected areas.

== Aftershocks ==
On 26 September at 12:30, two days after the major earthquake, another earthquake struck Mirpur, which led to a further 67 people being injured and one death reported. It was of magnitude 4.7 and centered at Thothal Mirpur at the depth of 10 kilometres (6.2 mi).

== See also ==
- List of earthquakes in 2019
- List of earthquakes in Pakistan
- 1885 Kashmir earthquake
