= Sochani =

Village in Azad Kashmir, Pakistan

Sochani سوچانی
- Village
- Country: Pakistan
- Region: Azad Kashmir
- District: Mirpur
- Tehsil: Dadyal

Population (1998)
  - Total: 536
- Time zone: UTC+5 (PST)

Sochani is a village in Dadyal Tehsil of Mirpur District, Azad Kashmir, Pakistan. The High Court of Azad Jammu and Kashmir identifies Sochani as a locality within Dadyal Tehsil, Mirpur District.

== Demography ==
According to the 1998 village list for Mirpur District, Sochani had a population of 536.
