= Harpalpur, Hardoi =

Harpalpur Harpālpur
- Populated place
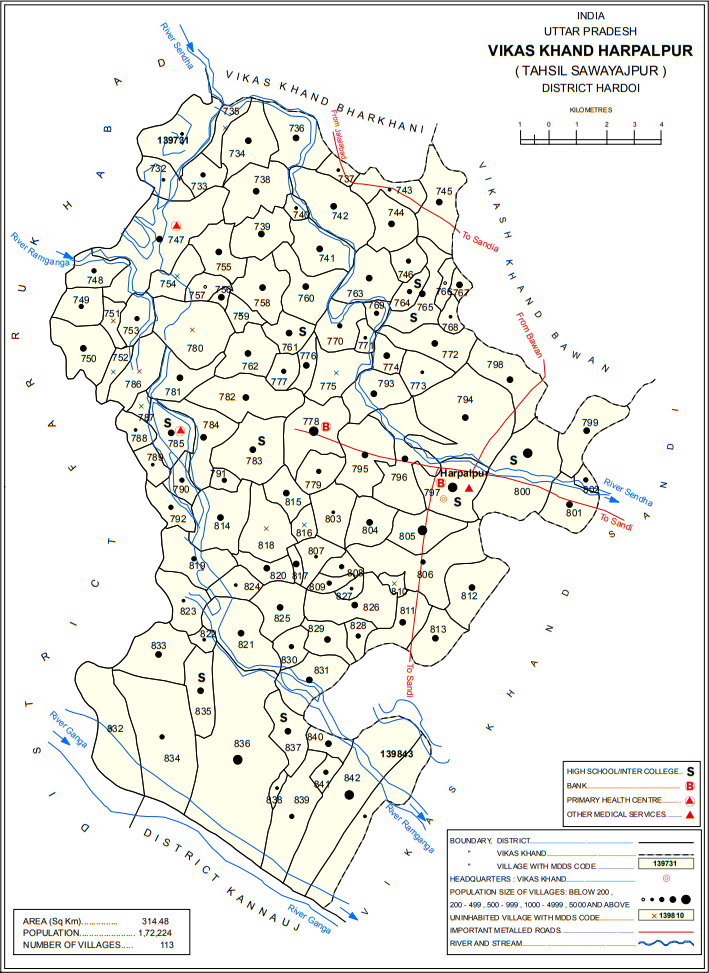
- Map showing Harpalpur (#797) in Harpalpur CD block

- Location in Uttar Pradesh, India Harpalpur (India)
- Coordinates: 27.324631°N 79.839526°E
- Country: India
- State: Uttar Pradesh
- District: Hardoi

Area
  - Total: 4.912 km^{2} (1.897 sq mi)

Population (2011)
  - Total: 8,822
  - Density: 1,796/km^{2} (4,652/sq mi)

Languages
  - Official: Hindi
- Time zone: UTC+5:30 (IST)

Harpalpur is a village and corresponding community development block in Sawayajpur tehsil of Hardoi district, Uttar Pradesh, India. It is located west of Sandi, on the road to Fatehgarh. The main staple crops here are wheat, rice, and maize. Markets are held twice weekly. As of 2011, the population of Harpalpur is 8,822, in 1,544 households. The total block population is 172,224, in 29,232 households.

== History ==
Around the turn of the 20th century, Harpalpur's main landowner was the Rani of Katiari, who held the village on a permanent settlement. It had become the site of a police station, which was previously located in the neighbouring village of Palia. As of the 1901 census, its population was 1,182, including 91 Muslims.

The 1961 census recorded Harpalpur as comprising 3 hamlets, with a total population of 1,779 (968 male and 811 female), in 368 households and 214 physical houses. The area of the village was given as 1,295 acres. Amenities recorded at the time included a medical practitioner, a hospital, and a post office.

The 1981 census recorded Harpalpur as having a population of 344, in 64 households, and covering an area of 497.38 hectares.

== Villages ==
Harpalpur CD block has the following 113 villages:

Village name	Total land area (hectares)	Population (in 2011)
Saee	397.4	459
Jeuri	539.1	230
Barhauli	33.7	622
Gauria Sisala	251.3	1,149
Gauria Pansala	164.8	0
Ghorhi Thar	355.8	1,885
Mubarakpur	91.1	429
Bamh Rauli	414.1	2,346
Bhupatipur Nagar	276.4	1,763
Chatkapur	45.9	451
Bamtapur Nand Bagh	317.2	1,230
Shahabuddinpur	449.2	2,277
Sanjhara	207.7	410
Auhadpur	235.3	1,078
Kakrauaa	438.7	2,591
Padamlapur	139	720
Aliganj Nan Kheriya	873.9	2,105
Nagriya Cut	128.5	916
Kudha	162.9	550
Arjunpur Sisala	474.9	4,387
Arjunpur Pansala	127.6	0
Sidheypur	80.4	0
Bhawanipur	80.1	560
Molhanpur Pansala	202.5	0
Molhanpur Sisala	263.1	2,144
Surjoopur Durjana Sisala	287.1	1,580
Surjoopur Durjana Pansala	223.5	81
Tithi Gaon Sisala	190.5	2,235
Tithi Gaon Pansala	384.2	0
Bari (Barra)	400.7	1,811
Sirsa	85.4	1,514
Nagra Choudharpur	448.2	2,500
Mirgawan	318.1	2,242
Nagriya Sadhau	84.5	569
Pithnapur	281.3	1,063
Muthauli	74.4	33
Mahsoolapur	122.5	2,210
Haraiya	89.7	365
Mahua Koli	89.4	562
Choudhariapur	253.6	653
Sultanpur	70	229
Jeuri Chandrampur	340.6	2,063
Barsana	169.8	311
Newada	295.5	1,093
Khamhaura Pansala	135.5	0
Khamhaura Sisala	115.2	1,092
Gadnapur	135.9	911
Khasaura	614.7	7,260
Surjupur	112	850
Sildaspur	2.6	0
Shyampur	360.2	1,489
Behta Rampura	247	2,061
Dharampur	409.4	3,286
Chaunpur	365.8	1,928
Barha Gaon	234.9	1,642
Nagra	2.5	0
Gangeypur	260.2	0
Rabiapur	81.8	209
Kharagpur	89.6	479
Bari	221.9	583
Bundapur	63.7	540
Saresar	131.7	803
Karak Chamau	307.4	1,343
Satautha	797.6	3,992
Bhusehra	406.4	2,486
Malautha	559.1	4,432
Harpalpur (block headquarters)	491.2	8,822
Roshanpur	439.4	2,052
Bansy	381.4	1,737
Kakra	716.3	5,746
Iknaura	315.3	2,165
Rani Khera	62.7	989
Deorania	39.4	259
Kathetha	203.4	2,517
Palia Sisala	531	9,250
Palia Pansala	135	539
Gadherha	44.6	273
Mahdain Kalan	109.8	505
Mahday Khurd	97.9	546
Kiratpur	0	0
Ghatwasa	262.8	2,449
Bhatauli Dharam	407.8	2,709
Laluwa Mau	319	3,039
Dhania Mau	420.2	2,005
Shekhapur Nagria Kadim	269.3	1,854
Shekhapur Nagria Jadid	269.3	0
Chanda Mohammadpur Sisala	350.4	2,819
Chanda Mohammadpur Pansala	90.6	0
Manduwdpur Narautha	360.4	847
Kharuddinpur	218.6	1,304
Baran	323.4	1,171
Surjanapur	69.4	327
Didwan	162.9	480
Mastapur	147.8	281
Parchauli	372.3	2,501
Dayalpur	421.9	2,534
Pura Anta	55.8	490
Ismailpur	116.5	756
Tikar	178.1	1,351
Poora Ratan	128.7	723
Beerhijor	344.8	2,236
Gadanpur	279	0
Bara Mau Sisala	278.8	1,534
Bara Mau Pansala	1,052.1	622
Dhak Pura	275.7	1,304
Dahalitha	1,700.9	7,440
Murwa Shahabuddinpur	254.4	1,608
Ram Nagar	60	471
Murcha	375.4	753
Behta Lakhi	125.8	1,108
Alampur	158.7	984
Arwal Paschim	707.6	5,925
Arwal Poorab	707.6	397
