= Sahalia =

Village in Pakistan

Coordinates: 33°19′58″N 73°41′0″E

Sahalia is a village in the Dadyal Tehsil of Mirpur District, Azad Kashmir, Pakistan.
