= Abdulahpur =

Settlement in Pakistan

Coordinates: 29.7729712°N 72.5977452°E

Abudulahpur is a village in the Mirpur Tehsil of Mirpur District of Azad Kashmir, Pakistan.

== Demography ==
According to 1998 census of Pakistan, its population was 215.

== History ==
Like in many villages in the Mirpur region, many villages have immigrated to the United Kingdom. The Gakhar tribe makes up the bulk of the village population.
