= Kakra =

Kakra Town
- Location within Azad Kashmir
- Coordinates: 33°07′33″N 73°52′47″E
- Country: Pakistan
- Province: Azad Kashmir

Population
  - Estimate: 1,696
- Time zone: UTC+5 (PST)
- Area code: 058274

Kakra is a village in Mirpur District of Azad Kashmir, Pakistan. situated at coordinates 33°7'33"N 73°52'47"E. The nearest village is Potha Bainsi. It is 26 km from the city of Jhelum.

== Demography ==
According to the 1998 census of Pakistan, its population was 1,696.

== History ==
Its old name is Kakra and new name is Kakra Town. New Kakra Town was built in 1964 as the old Kakra village was engulfed by the waters of Mangla Lake, after the constructions of the Mangla Dam. As a result of the building of the dam, the residents of old Kakra either moved to new Kakra or migrated to the Punjab and Sindh provinces of Pakistan. Surrounding villages include Paljura Town, Bangrilla and Jatlan.
