= Rajoa =

Village in Pakistan

Coordinates: 33.3018°N 73.0482°E

Rajoa

Rajoa is a village in Tehsil Dudyal, District Mirpur of Pakistan administered Jammu Kashmir. Neighboured by Thara, Smor, Bloh, Chalayar, Dagar and Behari. According to the 1998 census of Pakistan, its population was 504; its inhabitants are mainly of the same family of Ghakhar Rajputs. The shrine of the Sufi saint Baba Badar Shah (known as Chamba Darbar) is situated here.

Like much of Mirpur, Rajoa has deep ties with the United Kingdom. Many people originally from Rajoa have settled in Birmingham and its surrounding area.
