= Chakswari Tehsil =

Tehsil in Azad Kashmir, Pakistan

Chakswari چکسواری
- Tehsil
- Location in Azad Kashmir
- Coordinates: 33.264°N 73.783°E
- Country: Pakistan
- State: Azad Kashmir
- District: Mirpur District

Population (2017)
  - Total: 21,123
  - Estimate (2018): 21,475
- Time zone: UTC+5 (PST)
- Number of Union councils: 15

Chakswari (Pothwari / Urdu: چکسواری), also known as Chaksawari, is a tehsil (subdistrict) in the Mirpur District of Azad Kashmir, Pakistan. It comprises 15 Union councils including the Islamgarh Municipal Committee. The Mangla Dam project affected inhabitants of Chakswari and Islamgarh. Chakswari is 26 miles or 41.84 km from Mirpur.

Chakswari comprises many villages that border the Mangla Dam and surround the Chakswari bazaar. Pre-Mangla Dam the Old Mirpur City (now submerged under the Mangla Dam) was near Chakswari.

== Geography ==
Chakswari comprises partly plain and partly hilly areas and the climate is generally arid with little rainfall and is characterised by hot summers and cool winters. Chakswari is divided into two parts, the historic old town where the majority of the wholesale shops are based.

Notable parts of Chakswari include Dhamyal, Kalyal, Buna Mora or Taki Kalyal, Ladhar, Susral, Panyam, Rachyal, Roopyal, Tagdew.

In early days all above villages were counselled by one leader from Dhamyal, the Lambardar family from Dhamyal.

The main Potohar areas of LA-2 Tehsil are the following:

1. Dhamyal 2. Kalyal including Buna Mora or Taki Kalyal 2. Panyam 3. Susraal 4. Rachyal 5. Tang dew 6. Palak 7. Pind Khurd 8. Dheri Phali 9. Dheri Barwan 10. Boa 11. Kaneli 12. Mawah 13. Bajjar 14. Herdochi 15. Potha Bainsi 16.Ladhar 17.Chak

== Villages ==
- Andrah Kalan

== Gallery ==
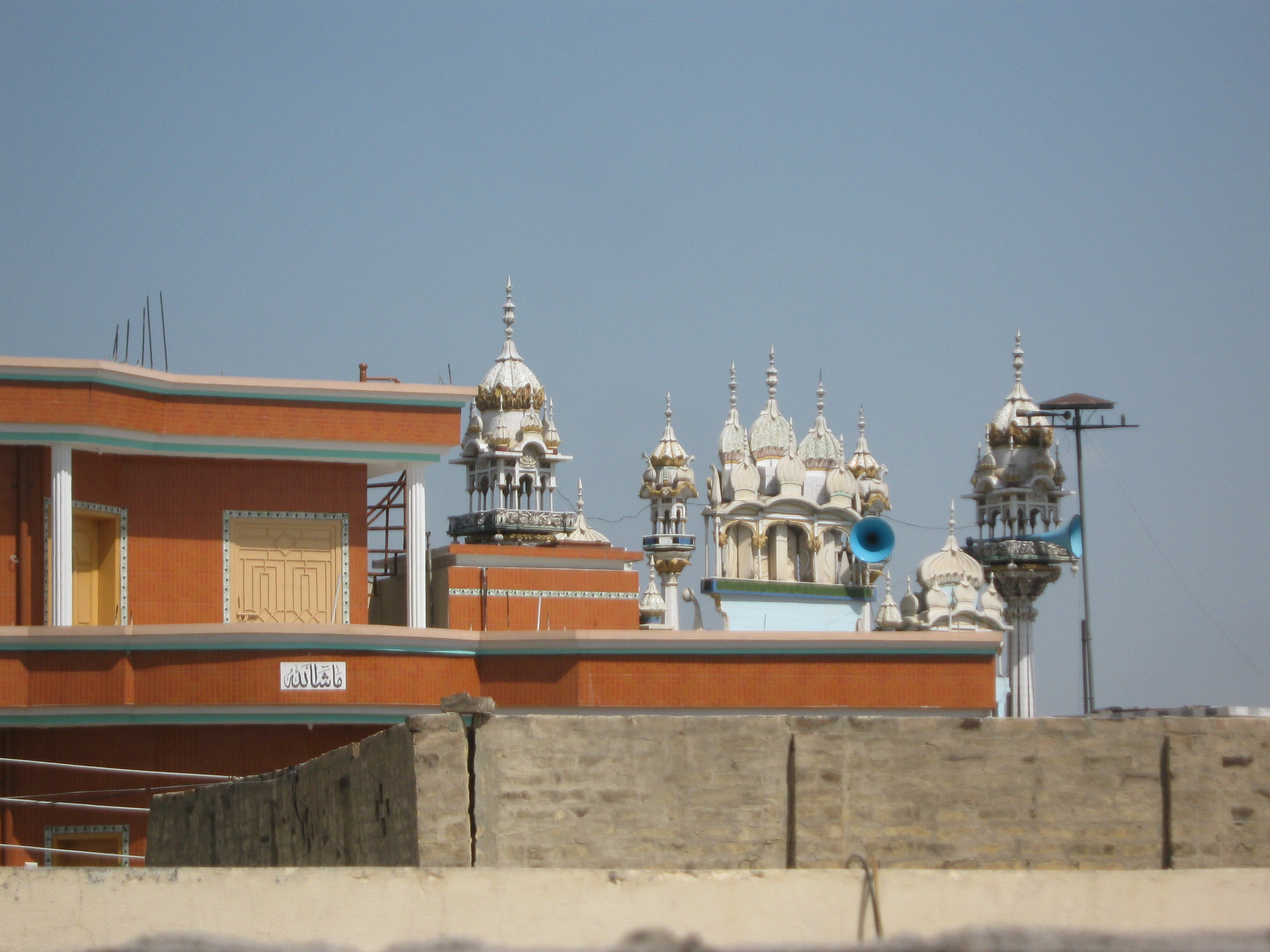
Kalyal Mosque, Chakswari

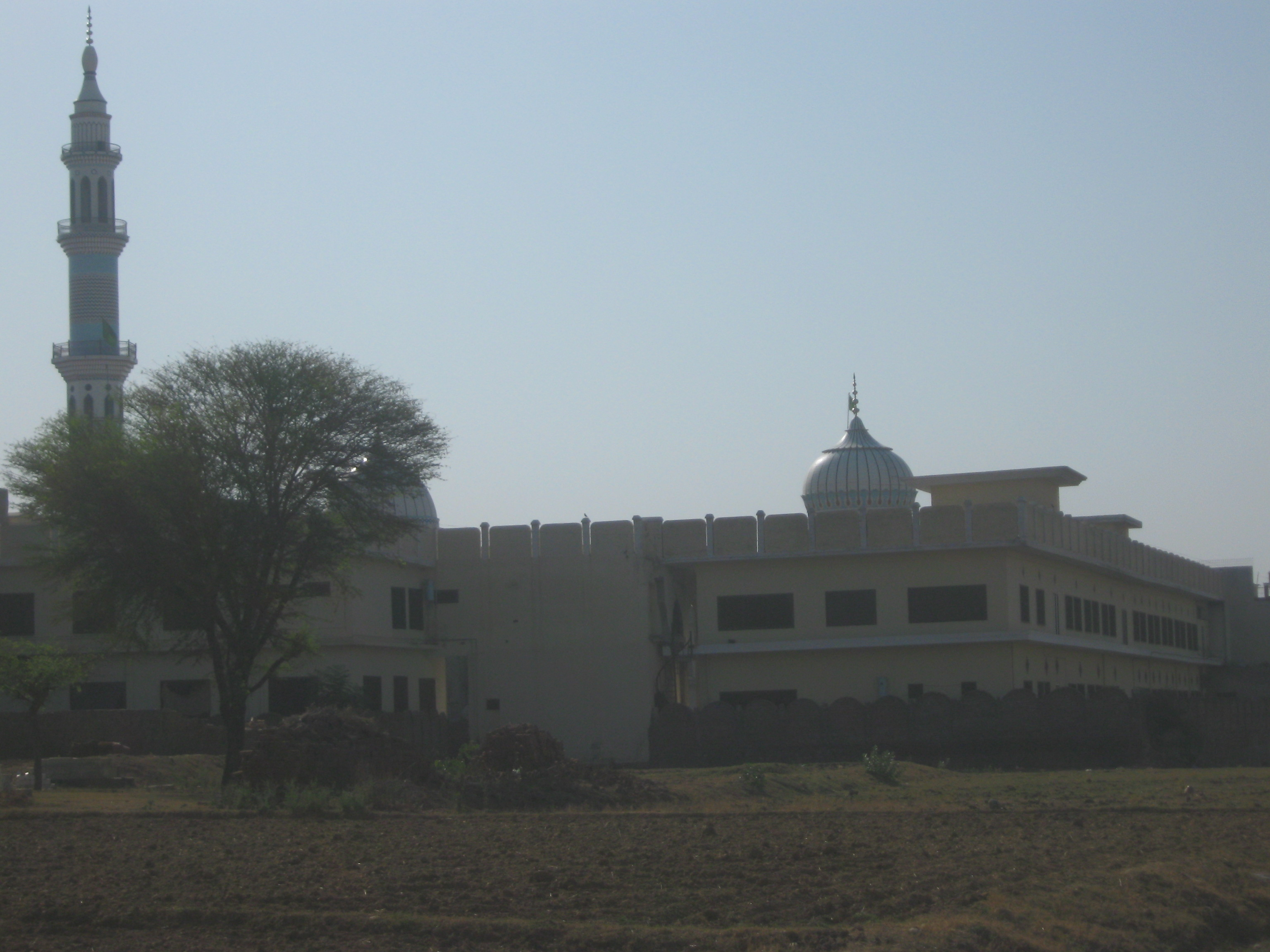
Chakswari Grand Central Jamia Mosque

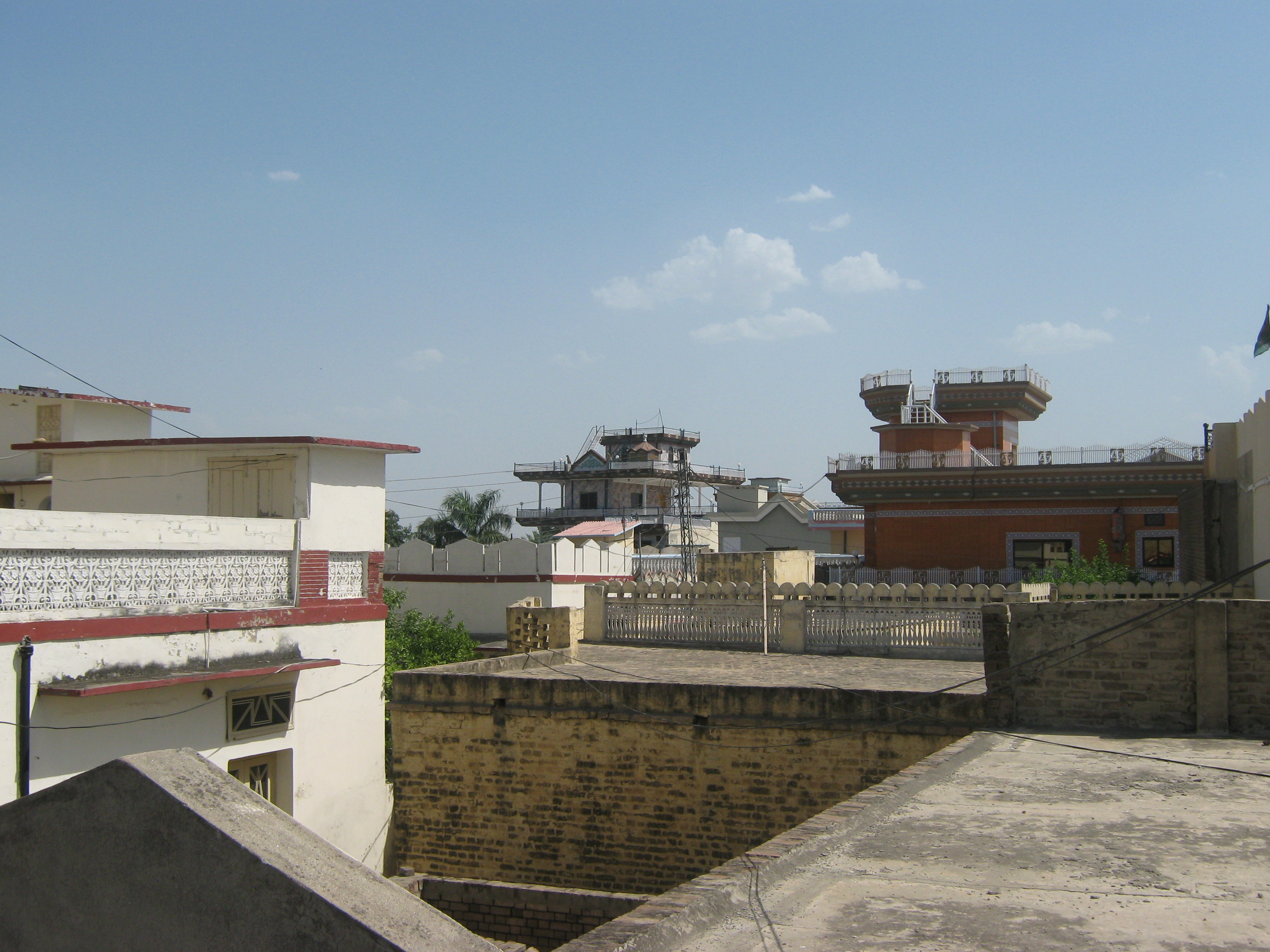
Houses of Kalyal

== Notable people ==
- Zaman Khan – (born 2001), cricketer
