= Mandi, Mirpur =

Village in Azad Kashmir, Pakistan

Mandi is a village in the Dadyal tehsil of Mirpur District of Azad Kashmir, Pakistan.

== Demography ==
According to the 1998 census of Pakistan, its population was 160. The village has since expanded.

== History ==
Like many villages in the Mirpur region, many of its residents have emigrated to the United Kingdom. Most of the population belongs to the Gujjar tribe.
