= Arah Jagir =

Village in Pakistan

Arah Jagir is a village in the Mirpur Tehsil of Mirpur District of Azad Kashmir, Pakistan.

== Demography ==
According to 1998 census of Pakistan, its population was 335.

== History ==
Like in many villages in the Mirpur region, many villagers have immigrated to the United Kingdom. The Gakhar tribe makes up the bulk of the village population.
