= Islamgarh =

Islamgarh اسلام گڑھ
- Village
- Location in Azad Kashmir
- Coordinates: 33.1918°N 73.8360°E
- Country: Pakistan
- State: Azad Kashmir

Population (2017)
  - Total: 16,651

Islamgarh (Urdu: اسلام گڑھ) is a tehsil and Municipal Committee of Mirpur District near Mangla Dam of Azad Jammu and Kashmir. It is located on the southern part of the Pir Panjal Range, about 28 Kilometer in North-East of Mirpur. It had a population of 175,651 in 2023.

== History ==
In 997 CE, Sultan Mahmud Ghaznavi, took over the Ghaznavid dynasty empire established by his father, Sultan Sebuktegin, In 1005 he conquered the Shahis in Kabul, followed by the conquests of the Punjab region. The Delhi Sultanate and later Mughal Empire ruled the region. The Punjab region became predominantly Muslim due to missionary Sufis whose dargahs dot the landscape of Kashmir.

After the decline of the Mughal Empire, the Sikhs overran the region and later Dogra invaded and occupied Mirpur District. The Muslims faced severe restrictions during the Dogra occupation. During the period of British rule, Mirpur District increased in population and importance.

The predominantly Muslim population supported the Muslim League and Pakistan Movement. After the independence of Pakistan in 1947, the minority Hindus and Sikhs migrated to India while Muslim refugees from Jammu division settled down in the Mirpur District.

Many residents of Islamgarh have emigrated to the United Kingdom during the 1950-60s.

Rapid progress and fast growing population gave Islamgarh the status of town committee in 1979 and after attaching the union council Andrah Klan and village Kalyal Bainsi to Islamgarh, its status was raised to Municipal Committee in 1998. Total population of Municipal Committee, according to the 1998 census, was 15493. If the annual population growth rate is considered 3.1%, it means the population of Municipal committee must be 33000 in 2017. Total area of the municipal committee is 14,728 acres or 57 square kilometers. It means the density of population is 333 people per square kilometer. The population of area will increase if proposed bridge is constructed between Rathoa Muhammad Ali and Chak Haryam. In that case distance would be reduce to 5–7 Kilometers and it would become part of Mirpur.

== Geography ==
On the Northern side of this town are mountain stretches of Pirgali and on Northern-Western side lie patches of fertile land connected to Mangla dam. After Mangla Dam start the boundaries of New Mirpur city.

Before the construction of Mangla Dam, Islamgarh was 5 kilometer away from the old Mirpur. The people of Islamgarh could easily approach that city on foot. But after the construction of Mangla Dam, the 5 kilometer distance became 30 kilometer. The road connecting Mirpur with Dadyal and Kotli passes through this town. On both sides of this road are fertile lands. Major crops of this region are wheat, maize and millet. After the construction of Mangla dam, a large portion of fertile land submerged. Now due to Mangla Dam raising project, the people of adjoining villages (Chak Haryam, Andrah Klan, Bajar, Bandor, Lakhora, part of Kalyal Bainsi and Jammuie villages have sacrifice their homes and land.

== Islamgarh Welfare Trust ==
The trust is a registered Non-Governmental Organisation (NGO) in Pakistan and serves the health needs of the local population.

The trust aims are to:

Provide healthcare services, including emergency and maternity services at subsidised rates. Free of charge to those that are registered recipients of Zakah and residing within the Trust’s catchment area. Provide 24-hour service and other facilities such as maternity centre, eye centre, ultrasound machinery, medical store, ambulance services, laboratory and x-ray. Serve registered families.

Amongst the features of the Trust:

Continually served the needs of the local population. Administrated by the committed individual volunteers and all 100% of public donations are spent on the patients. All trust assets are registered. Centrally located and easily accessible for the members of the public. Construction of a new hospital building built on public donated land.

British Friends of Islamgarh Welfare Trust is a British registered charity with charity number 1117121. It is specifically established to support the objectives of the Islamgarh Welfare Trust and to raise funds to meet the aspirations of the trust.
