= Chatan (Mirpur) =

Chattan is a village the Mirpur Tehsil of Mirpur District of Azad Kashmir.

== Demography ==
According to 1998 census of Pakistan, its population was 126.

== History ==
Like many villages in the Mirpur region, many of its residents have emigrated to the United Kingdom.
