= Balathi =

Village in Azad Kashmir, Pakistan

Balathi ( بلھتی ) is a village in Dadyal tehsil, Mirpur District, Azad Kashmir, Pakistan. It is situated on the bank of the river Jhelum, approximately 10 km (6.2 mi) west of Dadyal. It has an approximate population of 6,000. The area is mainly agricultural. Also just outside of the Punjab region
