= Chabrian Dattan =

Chabrian Jattan
- Location within Azad Kashmir
- Coordinates: 33°03′29″N 73°47′07″E
- Country: Pakistan
- Province: Azad Kashmir

Population
  - Estimate: 1,941
- Time zone: UTC+5 (PST)

Chabrian Jattan is a village in the Mirpur Tehsil of Mirpur District of Azad Kashmir, Pakistan.

== Demography ==
According to 1998 census of Pakistan, its population was 1941.

== History ==
Like in many villages in the Mirpur region, many villagers have emigrated to the United Kingdom. The population is made up of the Jarral Rajput and Jat communities.
