= Haveli Baghal =

Haveli Baghal is a village in the Dadyal tehsil of Mirpur District of Azad Kashmir, Pakistan.

== Demography ==
According to the 1998 census, its population was 761.

== History ==
Like many villages in the Mirpur region, many of its residents have emigrated to the United Kingdom. The village means the mansion of the Baghal. The Baghal are a clan of the ghakhar kiani biradri of potohar.
