= Nagial =

Village in Pakistan

Nagial, Nagyal , Nangyal or Nagiyal is a village in the Mirpur Tehsil of Mirpur District of Azad Kashmir, Pakistan.

At the time of the 1998 Pakistani census, its population was 741.
