= AMB =

AMB may refer to:

- Active magnetic bearing
- Advanced Memory Buffer, used in Fully Buffered DIMM memory
- Al-Aqsa Martyrs Brigades, one of the armed sections of the Palestinian Fatah movement
- Ambergate railway station, abbreviation used in the (UK) National Rail code
- Ambilobe Airport, an airport serving Ambilobe, a city in the Antsiranana province in Madagascar by IATA airport code
- American Medical Bureau, a humanitarian institution operating during the Spanish Civil War
- Amphotericin B, an anti-fungal drug
- Àrea Metropolitana de Barcelona, public body in Barcelona
- Axe Murder Boyz, a two-man rap group Otis & Bonez Dubb
- A US Navy hull classification symbol: Auxiliary base minesweeper (AMb)
- Central Bank of Azerbaijan (Azərbaycan Mərkəzi Bankı)

Amb may refer to:

- Amb (Dadyal), a town in the Azad Kashmir territory, Pakistan
- Amb (princely state), a region in the former Pashtun Tanoli empire
- Amb, India, a town of the Himachal Pradesh State, India
- Amb, Pakistan, a village in the Khyber Pakhtunkhwa province of Pakistan
- Amb special form, a nondeterministic programming construct
