= Ghaseetpur Awan =

Ghaseetpur Awan is a village in the Mirpur Tehsil of Mirpur District of Azad Kashmir, in Pakistan.

== Demography ==
According to the 1998 census of Pakistan, its population was 798.
