= Thalarajwali Khan =

Village in Mirpur District of Azad Kashmir, Pakistan

Thalarajwali Khan is a village in Tehsil Dadyal, Mirpur District of Azad Kashmir, Pakistan. It is located on the Jhelum River.

Rajwali Khan was the local village headman, said to have founded the village. Many of the erstwhile residents of Thalarajwali Khan are settled in the Midlands and High Wycombe in the United Kingdom

According to the 1998 census of Pakistan, its population was 370. Most of the population belong to the Rajput tribe.
