= Kas Kalyal =

Village in Azad Kashmir, Pakistan

Kas Kalyal is a village in the Mirpur Tehsil of Mirpur District of Azad Kashmir, Pakistan.

== Demography ==
According to the 1998 census of Pakistan, its population was 1,614.

== History ==
Like in many villages in the Mirpur region, many villagers have emigrated to the United Kingdom. The village gets its name from the Kalyal tribe of Jatts, who form the majority of the population.
