= Thub =

Village in Azad Kashmir, Pakistan

Coordinates: 33°21′50″N 73°45′08″E

Thub is a village in Dadyal Tehsil of Mirpur District, Azad Kashmir, Pakistan. The village lies on the banks of Poonch River.

After the formation of Pakistan people living in the village were very poor. Their prime source of income was agriculture. The construction of Mangla Dam—begun in 1962 and completed in 1967—led to the government allowing citizens of Azad Kashmir to move abroad, and many families moved to Great Britain. Now Thub is the richest village of Mirpur. Following the 2004 by Mangla Dam uprising, the people of Thub received money from the government of Azad Kashmir.

The grandfather of the British MP Zarah Sultana emigrated from the village in the 1960s.

== Demography ==
According to the 1998 census of Pakistan, the population of Thub Jagir was 624. It is one of the wealthiest villages in Mirpur District. Many people from Thub are settled in Great Britain.
