= Chak Haryam =

Village in Pakistan

Coordinates: 33°10′N 73°49′E

Chak Haryam (Urdu:چک ہریام) is a village, near Islamgarh in the Chakswari tehsil of Mirpur District of Azad Kashmir, Pakistan.

== Demography ==
According to 1998 census of Pakistan, its population was 973 and is currently estimated to be about 500.

== History ==
Like many villages in the Mirpur region, many of its residents have emigrated to the United Kingdom. The migration of many residents from the village chakharyam to Bradford in West Yorkshire was due to the abundance of the wool and textile industry. People settled roots and started a new life with their families. Bradford is also referred to as little Mirpur due to the mass migration of people from Mirpur.
