= Andrah Kalan =

Coordinates: 33°11′N 73°49′E

Andrah Kalan is a village in the Chakswari tehsil of Mirpur District of Azad Kashmir, Pakistan.

== Demography ==
According to 1998 census of Pakistan, its population was 1,003.

== History ==
Like in many villages in the Mirpur region, people of many villages have immigrated to the United Kingdom. Andrah Kalan is known for having one of its sons Choudhry Lal Hussain elected as the Chair of Mirpur district Council.
