= Dalyala =

Dhalyala Dalyala Rajgan
- Location in Pakistan
- Coordinates: 32°58′N 73°48′E
- Country: Pakistan
- Region: Azad Kashmir
- District: Mirpur District
- Houses: 100

Population
  - Total: unknown
- Time zone: UTC+5 (PST)

Dalyala (or Dhalyala) is a village found in Azad Kashmir in the Khari Sharif area of Pakistan it is composed mostly of Sohlan Rajputs. They are said to be of Panwar Rajput descent which is a sub-branch of the Paramara Rajputs. The village name is derived from the dhall, a type of shield used in medieval warfare.

== Geography and climate ==
Dhalyala is located at 32°56′36″N 73°48′13″E (32.900000, 73.750000) and lies at an altitude of 246 metres (818 ft) above sea-level.

The village as a whole has a moderate climate. In summer, temperatures can reach 43 °C, but the hot spells are comparatively short. The winter months are very pleasant with temperatures rarely falling below 1 °C.

== History ==
The ancient history of the region has seen it participate in the Indus Valley civilization and the Gandhara Civilization. At a later date, the Battle of the Hydaspes took place nearby, between the armies of Alexander the Great and the Indian king Porus.

== Sites of interest ==
The village lies between the ancient town of Sarai Alamgir and Mirpur. Nearby are the sites of the Jagu Head, Mangla Dam, Jhelum River, and the huge Rohtas Fort.
