= Upper Jhelum Canal =

Canal in Punjab, Pakistan

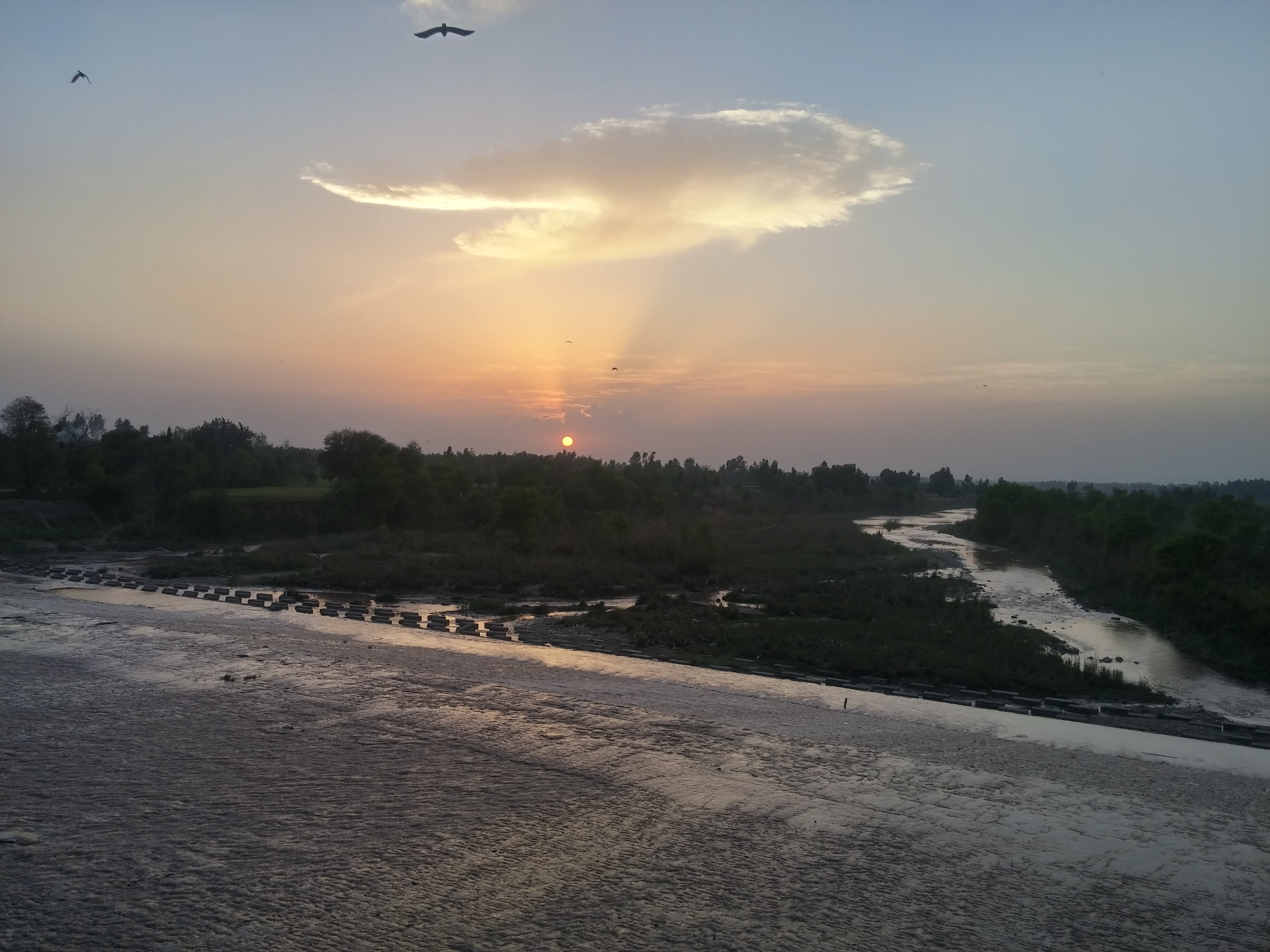
- Upper Jhelum Canal near Mirpur
- Interactive map of Upper Jhelum Canal
- Location: Punjab and Azad Kashmir
- Country: Pakistan
- Coordinates: 32°28′0″N 74°1′0″E

Specifications
- Length: 142 km (88 miles)
- Locks: None
- Status: Operational
- Navigation authority: Punjab Irrigation Department

History
- Principal engineer: Sir John Benton
- Construction began: 1913
- Date completed: 1916

Geography
- Start point: Jhelum River at Mangla Dam
- End point: Chenab River at Khanki Headworks

The Upper Jhelum Canal is an irrigation canal in Punjab, Pakistan that provides water to 7,284 square kilometers of farmland.

The Upper Jhelum Canal starts at the Jhelum River at Mangla Dam. It mainly runs through Mirpur district of Azad Kashmir and Gujrat district, slightly touching the area of Mandi Bahauddin district near Rasul Barrage. Then it finally ends up in the Chenab River at Khanki Barrage. Floodwater nullahs drain through the Upper Jhelum Canal into the Jhelum River at several locations.

The canal was designed and built by Sir John Benton, a British irrigation engineer, who later became inspector general of irrigation. Work on the canal started in 1913 and was completed in 1916 when the canal became fully operational.

In the 1960s, the construction of Mangla Dam forced the replacement of the canal's head regulator. On October 24, 2019, the canal was severely damaged by the 2019 Kashmir earthquake. The Punjab Irrigation Department closed the canal and rehabilitated it in a couple of weeks.
