= Potha Bainsi =

- Location within Azad Kashmir
- Coordinates: 33°07′51″N 73°52′31″E
- Country: Pakistan
- Province: Azad Kashmir

Population
  - Estimate: 1,391
- Time zone: UTC+5 (PST)

Potha Bainsi is a village in Mirpur District of Azad Kashmir, Pakistan. The nearest town is Kakra. It is approximately 8 miles east from the city of Mirpur and approx 20 miles from the city of Jhelum.

== Demography ==
According to the 1998 census of Pakistan, its population was 1,391.

== History ==
Potha Bainsi is relatively new town, built in the 1960s. The original Potha village was engulfed by the construction of the Mangla Dam. As a result of building of the dam, the residents of old Potha and surrounding villages either moved to new Potha Bainsi or migrated to Punjab and Sindh province of Pakistan. Some of the residents even migrated to other parts of world especially the United Kingdom after the local fields, where the majority of residents worked, were engulfed by the waters and the lack of work opportunities in nearby cities.
