= Chechian, Mirpur =

Village in Azad Kashmir, Pakistan

Coordinates: 33°04′52″N 73°45′10″E

Chechian is a village the Mirpur Tehsil of Mirpur District of Azad Kashmir, Pakistan.

== Demography ==
According to the 1998 census of Pakistan, its population was 663.

== Education ==
There is a government degree college for women in Chechian.
