= Khasaura =

- Populated place
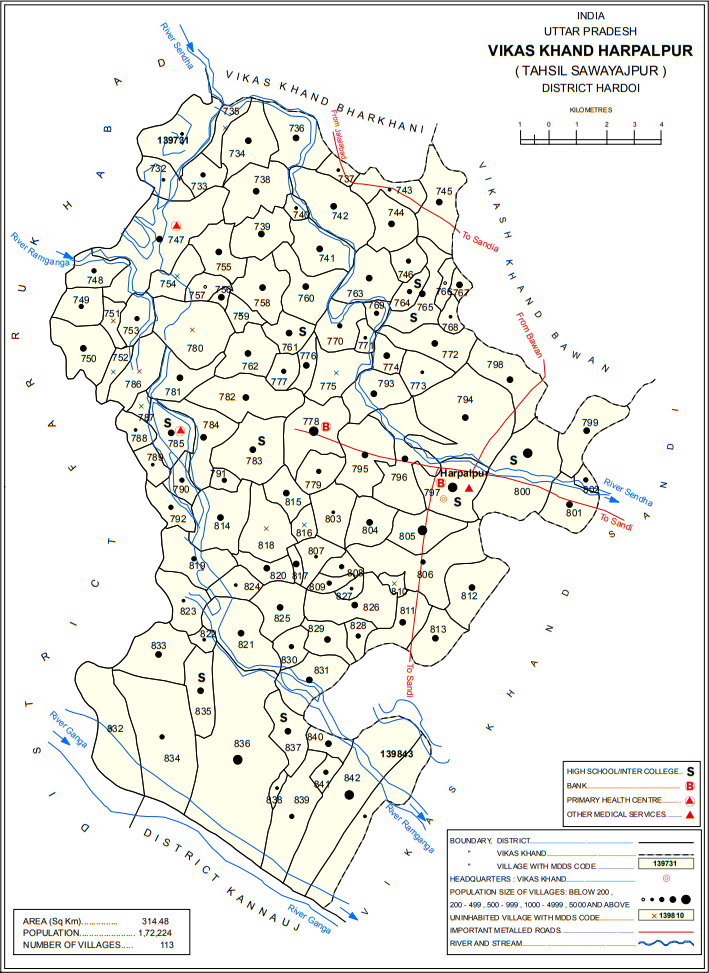
- Map showing Khasaura (#778) in Harpalpur CD block

- Location in Uttar Pradesh, India Khasaura (India)
- Coordinates: 27.344593°N 79.786033°E
- Country: India
- State: Uttar Pradesh
- District: Hardoi

Area
  - Total: 6.147 km^{2} (2.373 sq mi)

Population (2011)
  - Total: 7,260
  - Density: 1,180/km^{2} (3,060/sq mi)

Languages
  - Official: Hindi
- Time zone: UTC+5:30 (IST)

Khasaura is a large village in Harpalpur block of Hardoi district, Uttar Pradesh, India. It lies on the left bank of the Ramganga river, to the north of the road connecting Hardoi and Sandi with Farrukhabad. The village hosts a large market twice per week, on Wednesdays and Sundays. It deals mainly in vegetables.

As of 2011, the population of Khasaura is 7,260, in 1,215 households. The village lands cover an area of 614.7 hectares.

== History ==
Originally, Khasaura was occupied by the Thatheras and Baihar Ahirs, before they were driven out by Rai Deo Dat, the first Katyar chief to rule here. At the turn of the 20th century, the village consisted of two mahals, with the southern one still being held by the Katyar zamindars and the northern one held by the Rani of Katiari on a permanent settlement. A government school had been set up in Khasaura by that time. The population as of the 1901 census was 3,023, including 116 Muslims, while the majority of the Hindu population belonged to the Ahir community.

The 1961 census recorded Khasaura (as "Khasora") as comprising 7 hamlets, with a total population of 3,230 (1,716 male and 1,514 female), in 662 households and 482 physical houses. The area of the village was given as 1,225 acres. The average attendance of the bazaar was then roughly 200.

The 1981 census recorded Khasaura as having a population of 4,417, in 116 households, and covering an area of 616.76 hectares.
