= Ghaseetpur Sohalian =

Village in Azad Kashmir, Pakistan

Ghaseetpur
- Village
- Country: Pakistan
- Territory: Azad Kashmir
- District: Mirpur District

Population (1998)
  - Total: 625
- Time zone: UTC+5 (PST)

Ghaseetpur Sohalian is a village in Mirpur (District of Azad Kashmir) Pakistan.

Ghaseetpur is a village in the Khari Sharif area of Azad Kashmir, Pakistan. It is located between the Upper Jhelum Link Canal to the north and the Jhelum River to the south.

== Geography ==
Ghaseetpur lies in an agricultural region of Mirpur District, with access to irrigation from both the Jhelum River and the Upper Jhelum Link Canal.

The village is believed to have been relocated inland from its original location along the river due to repeated flooding. The name “Ghaseetpur” is thought to derive from the Urdu word ghaseetna (گھسیٹنا), meaning "to drag".

== History ==
The region was significantly affected by the construction of the Mangla Dam in the 1960s. The project submerged over 280 villages and displaced more than 110,000 people in the Mirpur area.

The displacement contributed to large-scale migration from the region, particularly to the United Kingdom, where labour demand in industrial sectors attracted workers from Mirpur and surrounding areas.

== Demographics ==
According to the 1998 census of Pakistan, the village had a population of approximately 625.

The population is predominantly Muslim, with most residents following the Barelvi tradition of Sunni Islam.

== Ethnicity and society ==
The population of Ghaseetpur is primarily composed of Rajputs. Social organisation in the village is influenced by kinship and traditional clan structures.

== Economy ==
Agriculture is the main economic activity in the village. Crops such as rice and wheat are cultivated, supported by irrigation and seasonal rainfall associated with the monsoon.

The construction of the Mangla Dam improved irrigation systems and contributed to increased agricultural productivity in the region.

Remittances from overseas communities, particularly in the United Kingdom, form an important part of the local economy.

== Culture and religion ==
The nearby town of Khari Sharif is known for Sufi shrines and religious sites, contributing to the cultural and religious life of the region.

== Diaspora ==
Ghaseetpur has a significant diaspora, particularly in the United Kingdom. Migration patterns established during the mid-20th century continue to influence social and economic connections between the village and overseas communities.
