= Chauhdry Abdul Rashid =

English politician (1941–2024)

- چودھری عبدالرشید
- Born: 7 January 1941; Dadyal, Jammu and Kashmir, British India (now in Azad Kashmir, Pakistan)
- Died: 1 May 2024 (aged 83)
- Occupation: Politician

Chauhdry Abdul Rashid, JP (7 January 1941 – 1 May 2024) was an English politician who served as Lord Mayor of Birmingham from 2008 to 2009. He was one of three councillors representing the Bordesley ward in the heart of the city.

== Background ==
Abdul Rashid was born in Dadyal, Jammu and Kashmir, British India (now in Azad Kashmir, Pakistan) on 7 January 1941. He was educated at Ratta Middle School and left school aged thirteen in 1954. In 1955, he emigrated to the United Kingdom where he worked in the northern coastal town of Workington, Cumbria for seven and a half years.

Whilst working as a market trader, he studied part-time at the Workington College of Further Education. In May 1962 he returned to Pakistan, where he met and married Shafait, his wife for over 45 years. In 1963, he began work in Birmingham in the Drawing Office at George H Hughes, a local engineering firm. Abdul Rashid started his work in public life in 1980 when he was appointed to serve on the East Birmingham Community Health Council. This led in 1982 to his appointment to East Birmingham Health Authority, where he served until 1985.

In 1982 he also became a magistrate. Abdul Rashid served on the Small Heath Community Law Centre during the early 1980s and also served as its chairman.

== Councillor ==
In May 1987, Abdul Rashid was elected to Birmingham City Council from the Small Heath ward. He won this seat only a month before sitting his final examinations for a Social Science degree from Wolverhampton University.

Whilst serving as councillor he worked in the Black Country town of Dudley as a Council Community Social Worker and Liaison Officer. During this time he also served on the Black Country Talking Newspaper, Dudley Council of Faiths and Dudley One World.

In 2000, Abdul Rashid took early retirement from local government service due to ill health. In 2002 he picked up from where he left off and subsequently served on the board of Birmingham Family Housing Association, the board of St Peters (Saltley) Housing Association, as governor of Mathew Boulton College and as governor of Regents Park Primary School.

Abdul Rashid re-entered politics in 2004 and was elected as one of three councillors for the Nechells ward. His office expired in 2022.

== Lord Mayor ==
In May 2008, Abdul Rashid was appointed Lord Mayor of Birmingham. The following year he served, as is usual, as the Deputy Lord Mayor.

In 2009, Abdul Rashid appeared in an anti-terror television campaign funded by the UK Foreign and Commonwealth Office. He appeared in his role as Lord Mayor, alongside notable British Muslims. His life story was depicted in a documentary film produced in 2010.

== Death ==
Abdul Rashid died on 1 May 2024, at the age of 83.

Notable Relatives

Cllr Rizwan Jalil, serving Labour Party politician, Sandwell Metropolitan Borough Council
