= Satautha =

- Populated place
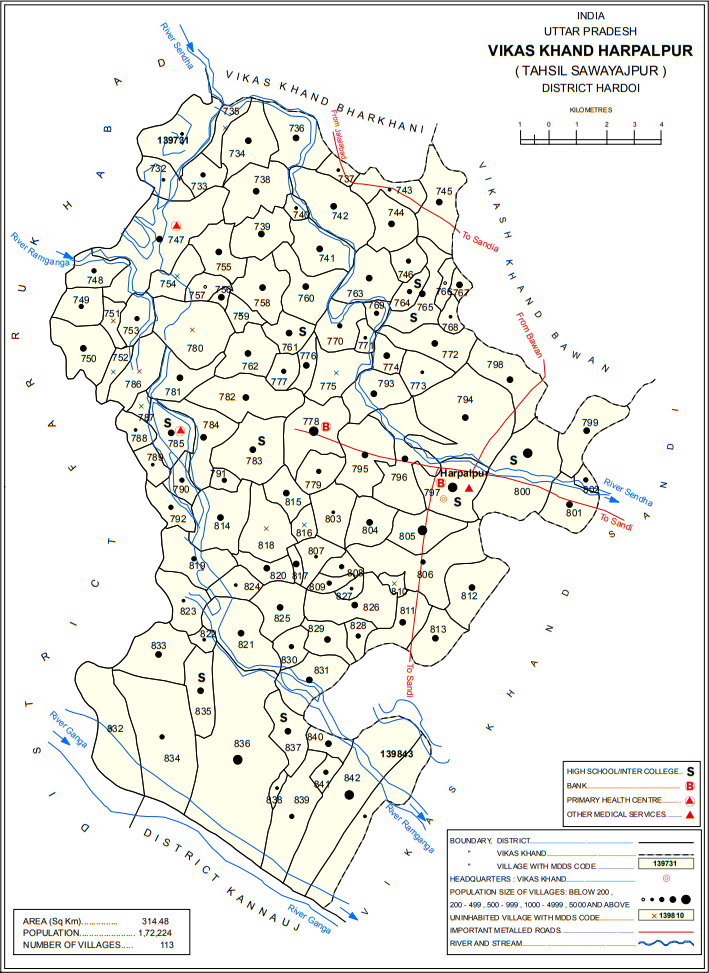
- Map showing Satautha (#794) in Harpalpur CD block

- Location in Uttar Pradesh, India Satautha (India)
- Coordinates: 27.343737°N 79.838808°E
- Country: India
- State: Uttar Pradesh
- District: Hardoi

Area
  - Total: 7.976 km^{2} (3.080 sq mi)

Population (2011)
  - Total: 3,992
  - Density: 500.5/km^{2} (1,296/sq mi)

Languages
  - Official: Hindi
- Time zone: UTC+5:30 (IST)

Satautha is a village in Harpalpur block of Hardoi district, Uttar Pradesh, India. The main staple crops here are wheat and rice. As of 2011, the population of Satathua is 3,992, in 727 households. The village lands cover an area of 797.6 hectares.

The 1961 census recorded Satathua as comprising 4 hamlets, with a total population of 1,524 (792 male and 732 female), in 281 households and 224 physical houses. The area of the village was given as 2,020 acres.
