= Kalyal Bhainsi =

- Location within Azad Kashmir
- Coordinates: 33°10′31″N 73°51′05″E
- Country: Pakistan
- Province: Azad Kashmir

Population
  - Estimate: 4.528
- Time zone: UTC+5 (PST)

Kalyal Bhainsi is a village in Mirpur District of Azad Kashmir, Pakistan.

== Demography ==
According to the 1998 census of Pakistan, its population was 4,528.
