= Amb (Dadyal) =

Town in Azad Kashmir, Pakistan

Coordinates: 33.3435°N 73.6463°E

Amb is a village in the Dadyal tehsil of Mirpur District of Azad Kashmir, Pakistan. It has a mosque which was built in the 1980s. It also has a Daab (Natural micro Water reserve) and hills and cliffs. The Bihari Qus (Rain water channel) flows through the Amb to Mangla dam and in old days to River Poonch passing the old river

== Demography ==
According to 1998 census of Pakistan, its population was 2,740.

== History ==
Like many villages in the Mirpur region, many of its residents have emigrated to the United Kingdom. Most people live in Birmingham. In the 90s, the mosque of the town was built. Later on, the mosque was refurbished. Amb village existed long before New Dadyal Town which was founded in 1966 with many people migrating to the United Kingdom and the United States.
