= Mirpur District =

District in Azad Kashmir, Pakistan

Mirpur District ضلع میرپور
- District of Azad Kashmir administered by Pakistan
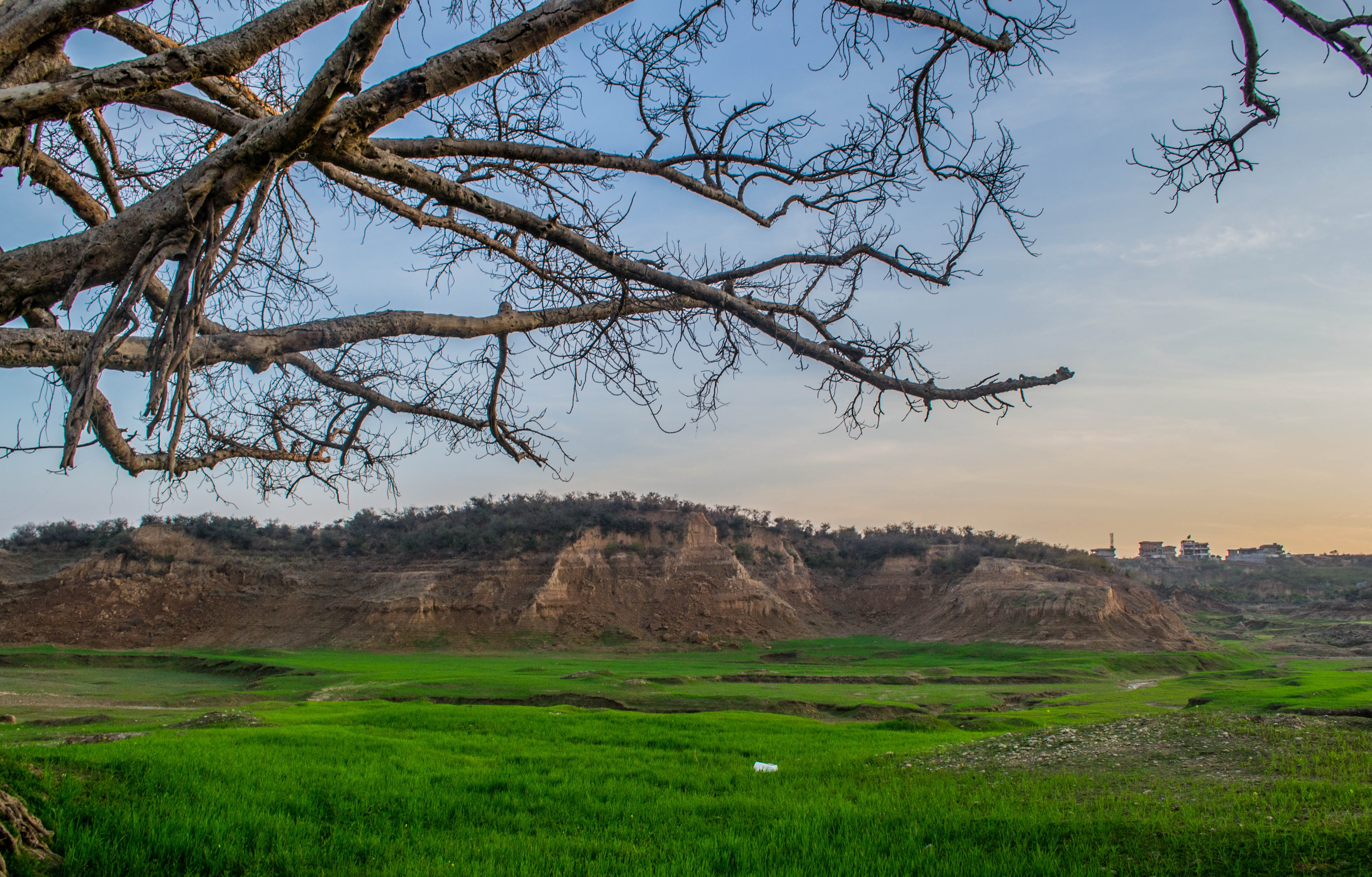
- Mirpur is the capital of Mirpur district

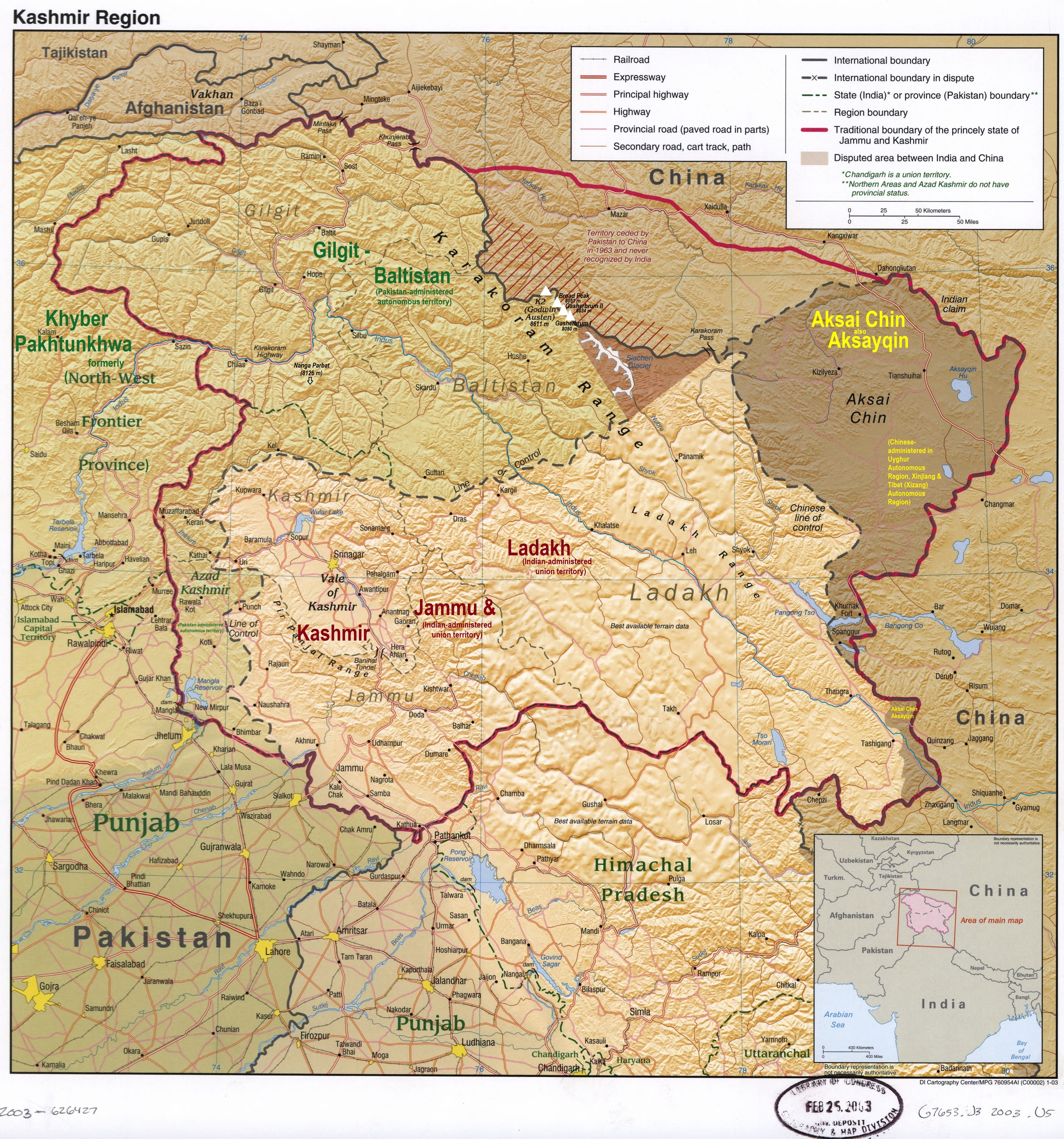
- Pakistani-administered Azad Kashmir (shaded in green) in the disputed Kashmir region
- Interactive map of Mirpur District
- Coordinates (Mirpur, Azad Kashmir): 33°9′0″N 73°44′0″E
- Administering country: Pakistan
- Territory: Azad Kashmir
- Division: Mirpur Division
- Headquarters: Mirpur

Government
  - Type: District Administration
  - Deputy Commissioner: N/A
  - District Police Officer: N/A
  - District Health Officer: N/A

Area
  - Total: 1,010 km^{2} (390 sq mi)

Population (2017)
  - Total: 456,200
  - Density: 452/km^{2} (1,170/sq mi)

Languages
  - Official: Urdu
  - Spoken: Pahari-Pothwari; Gojri
- Number of Tehsils: 2

Mirpur District (Urdu: ضلع میرپور) is a district of Pakistan-administered Azad Kashmir in the disputed Kashmir region. It is one of the ten districts of the territory. The Mirpur District is bounded on the north by the Kotli District, on the east by the Bhimber District, on the south by the Gujrat District of Punjab, Pakistan, on the south-west by the Jhelum District of Punjab, Pakistan, and on the west by Rawalpindi District. The district is named after its main city, Mirpur. The Mirpur District has a population of 456,200 and covers an area of 1,010 km^{2} (390 sq mi). The district is mainly mountainous with some plains. The Mirpur District has a humid subtropical climate which closely resembles that of the Gujrat District and the Jhelum District, the adjoining districts of Pakistan's Punjab Province.

Map of Azad Kashmir with the Mirpur District highlighted in red

== History ==
Azad Kashmir with the Mirpur Division (roughly coterminous with the pre-1947 Mirpur District) highlighted in red

During the British Raj, the Mirpur District was one of the five districts of the Jammu Province in the princely state of Jammu and Kashmir. According to the 1941 census, it had a population of 386,655, roughly 80% of whom were Muslim and 16% of whom were Hindu. It consisted of three tehsils: the Bhimber Tehsil, the Kotli Tehsil, and the Mirpur Tehsil. The Bhimber Tehsil and the Kotli Tehsil were subsequently promoted to district status. The three districts presently constitute the Mirpur Division of Azad Kashmir. Small portions of the former Mirpur District were included in the Rajouri District of Indian-administered Jammu and Kashmir.

The original Mirpur District, along with the Poonch District and the Rajouri District, had close geographic, ethnic, and cultural ties with the West Punjab area, more so than with the city of Jammu and the rest of the Jammu Province. Due to those reasons, scholar Christopher Snedden stated that the people of Mirpur area had a strong desire to join Pakistan during the partition.

In November 1947, the Mirpur District was the site of the Mirpur Massacre, where many Hindus, Sikhs, and refugees from the partition, were killed by armed tribesmen and soldiers.

== Language and ethnicity ==
The main language, native to an estimated 85% of the district's population, is known under a number of sometimes ambiguous names. Its speakers call it with various names: Pahari, Mirpur Pahari, Mirpuri, and Pothwari, while some label it as simply "Punjabi". Sociolinguists have regarded it as one of the three major sub-dialects of the Pahari-Pothwari dialect of Punjabi, which is intermediate between Lahnda Punjabi and Eastern Punjabi. Mirpur Pahari is mutually intelligible with the other two major dialects – Pothwari of the Potohar Plateau in the Punjab Province and the Pahari spoken to the north in Azad Kashmir and around Murree – and shares with them between 77% and 84% of its basic vocabulary, although the difference with the northernmost varieties (in Muzaffarabad) is sufficient to impede understanding. Mirpuri speakers have a strong sense of Kashmiri identity that takes precedence over linguistic identification with closely related groups outside of Azad Kashmir, such as the Punjabis of the Pothohar.

The Gujari language is spoken by an estimated 10% of the population. The local dialect is closely related to the Gujari varieties spoken in the rest of Azad Kashmir and in the Hazara region. Other languages spoken include Urdu and English.

== Government ==
The district is administratively subdivided into two tehsils:

- Dadyal Tehsil
- Mirpur Tehsil

== Villages ==
Notable villages in the district include:

=== Dadyal Tehsil ===
- Amb
- Balathi
- Chattroh
- Haveli Baghal
- Kathar Dilawar Khan
- Mandi
- Mohra Malkan
- Mohra Sher Shah
- Rajoa
- Ratta
- Sahalia
- Siakh Pahaith
- Thalarajwali Khan
- Thub

=== Mirpur Tehsil ===
- Abdulahpur
- Abdupur
- Andrah Kalan
- Arah Jagir
- Chabrian Dattan
- Chak Haryam
- Chakswari
- Chatan
- Chechian
- Chitterpari
- Dalyala
- Ghaseetpur Awan
- Ghaseetpur Sohalian
- Islamgarh
- Jangian Kotla
- Jatlan
- Kakra
- Kalyal Bhainsi
- Kas Kalyal
- Khari Sharif
- Khokhar
- Mehmunpur
- Nagial
- Potha Bainsi
- Sahang

== Bibliography ==
- Behera, Navnita Chadha (2007). Demystifying Kashmir. Pearson Education India. ISBN 978-8131708460.
- Hallberg, Calinda E.; O'Leary, Clare F. (1992). "Dialect Variation and Multilingualism among Gujars of Pakistan". In O'Leary, Clare F.; Rensch, Calvin R.; Hallberg, Calinda E. (eds.). Hindko and Gujari. Sociolinguistic Survey of Northern Pakistan. Islamabad: National Institute of Pakistan Studies, Quaid-i-Azam University and Summer Institute of Linguistics. pp. 91–196. ISBN 969-8023-13-5.
- Karim, Maj Gen Afsir (2013). Kashmir The Troubled Frontiers. Lancer Publishers LLC. pp. 29–32. ISBN 978-1-935501-76-3.
- Lothers, Michael; Lothers, Laura (2010). Pahari and Pothwari: a sociolinguistic survey (Report). SIL Electronic Survey Reports. Vol. 2010–012.
- Shackle, Christopher (1979). "Problems of classification in Pakistan Panjab". Transactions of the Philological Society. 77 (1): 191–210. doi:10.1111/j.1467-968X.1979.tb00857.x. ISSN 0079-1636.
- Shackle, Christopher (2007). "Pakistan". In Simpson, Andrew (ed.). Language and national identity in Asia. Oxford linguistics Y. Oxford University Press. ISBN 978-0-19-922648-1.
- Shakil, Mohsin (2012). "Languages of Erstwhile State of Jammu Kashmir (A Preliminary Study)". p. 12.
- Snedden, Christopher (2001). "What happened to Muslims in Jammu? Local identity, '"the massacre" of 1947' and the roots of the 'Kashmir problem'". South Asia: Journal of South Asian Studies. 24 (2): 111–134. doi:10.1080/00856400108723454. S2CID 143991832.
