= Jatlan =

Village in Azad Kashmir, Pakistan

Jatlan جاتلاں
- Village
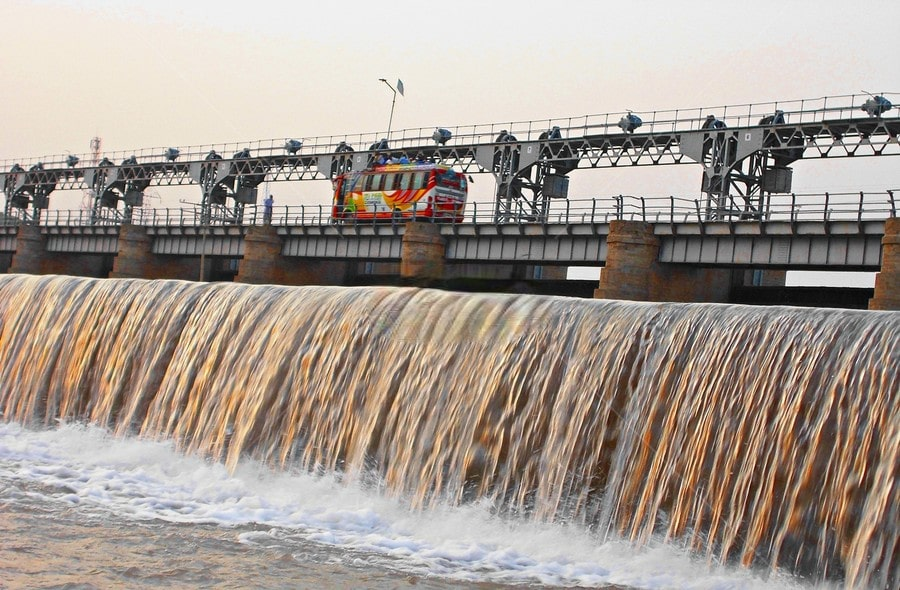
- Jatlan Head

- Location within Azad Jammu Kashmir Location within Pakistan
- Coordinates: 33°2′1″N 73°50′31″E
- Sovereign state: Pakistan
- Province: Azad Kashmir

Area
  - Total: 2,321 km^{2} (896 sq mi)

Population (1998)
  - Total: 2,214
- Time zone: Pakistan Standard Time
- Postal Code: 10250

Jatlan (Urdu: جاتلاں) is a bazaar that was once a village located on the northern bank of the Upper Jhelum Canal in the administrative region of Azad Kashmir, Pakistan. As of the most recent data available, Jatlan has a population of approximately 2,214 residents.

Jatlan, was at the epicentre of the 2019 Kashmir earthquake, a seismic event of magnitude 6 M_{ww}. This earthquake resulted in substantial damage to the village's infrastructure and caused widespread disruption to the lives of its residents.

Jatlan has several notable sites, including the Jatlan Head, a construction dating back to the British colonial period. The structure stands as a tangible testament to the architectural and engineering styles prevalent during the British colonial rule in the region.

== History ==
During the First Kashmir War the Indian army repulsed the Pashtun raiders near Srinagar on November 25, so the raiders redirected their efforts towards Mirpur, which is situated in present-day Azad Kashmir. Notably, political scientist Christopher Snedden has mentioned claims of a tragic event in Mirpur around November 25, during which it is alleged that approximately 20,000 non-Muslims lost their lives and an additional 2,500 individuals were reported as abducted. Moreover, in the wider district of Mirpur and adjacent regions of Poonch, there were reports of instances where Hindu and Sikh women faced rape and abduction. This harrowing episode has led to the commemoration of November 25 as "Mirpur Day" in Indian-administered Kashmir. Areas surrounding Jatlan were used for non-Muslims to flee from persecution from various villages. Over 300 individuals who identified as non-Muslims sought refuge in the residence of a prominent Sikh figure located in Naka Guru, situated approximately four miles to the north of Jatlan.

After Pakistan's independence, during the Sialkot War, the Mirpur-Jatlan road was a main route of travel by the Pakistani Army's M35 supply trucks advancing equipment. A number of residents from Jatlan enlisted and have been assigned in the military conflict with India.

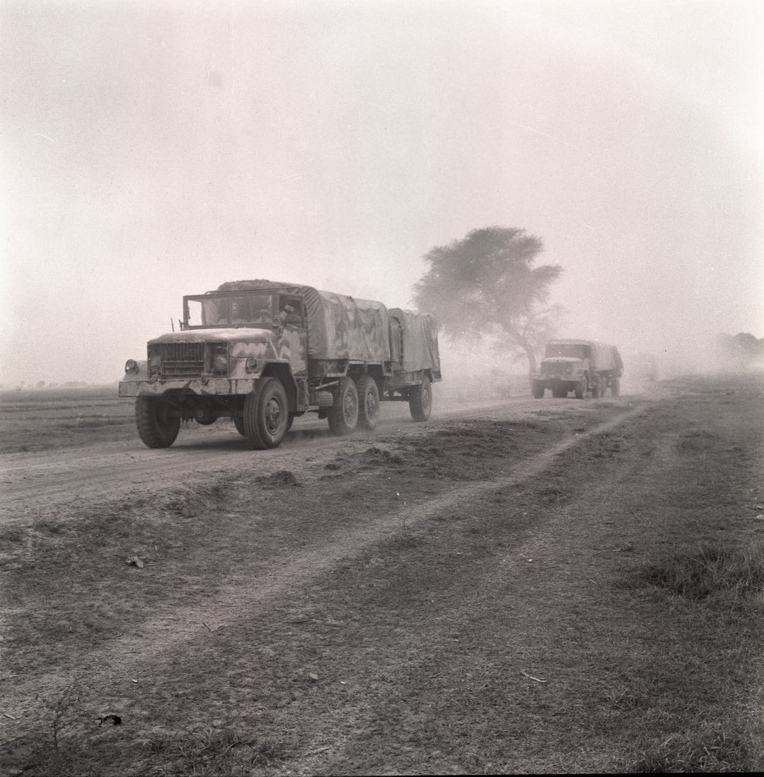
Pakistan Army M35 transporting equipment and personnel.

== Geography ==
Jatlan is situated 5 miles from Khari Sharif. Jatlan links Mirpur City with Bhimber district in Pakistan Kashmir and Gujrat district in the Pakistani province of Punjab. Over the years, Jatlan has become a major business and commercial hub for the region due to its geographical location.

Its climate is quite hot during the summer, where the maximum average temperature per annum is 40 degrees centrigrade, and other geographical conditions closely resemble those of Jhelum and Gujrat, adjoining districts of Pakistan. The topography of Jatlan, consists of plains and the foothills of the Himalayas. The main crop cultivated during summer is Millet and Pulses. However, other cash crops such as Wheat, Maize, Fruits like watermelon, and vegetables are also grown along the Jatlan canal. The product of quality rice from the paddy fields of Khari Sharif between Upper Jhelum Canal and River Jhelum is famous for its aroma and taste.

== Public Services ==
Jatlan's law enforcement is under the Azad Kashmir Police Force and has a Police Station (چوکی) of the main road containing a singular cell for inmate holding. Crime is rare in Jatlan and the police force most commonly investigate land-related incidents as well as immigration related incidents involving the Afghani population in Pakistan. Jatlan's police force are regularly deployed in large numbers across the town mainly around religious holidays and public holidays.

Paramedic services in Jatlan are carried out by EDHI having a large number of ambulance vehicles and a hospital located south of the town. The KIRF hospital is a community hospital with functional departments. During the COVID-19 pandemic the hospital was put to challenges which exhausted supplies and caused many patients with less serious problems to be turned away by the hospital.

The town also has one of the biggest orphanages in Pakistan (Kashmir Orphanage Relief Trust) which houses and provides education for orphans from Kashmir. The orphanage is operational from donations most notably from overseas Pakistanis residing in the United Kingdom. The orphanage came into foundation after the 2005 Kashmir earthquake, Mohammed Akhtar and his friends created a charity and raised with over £118,000 in just five days to provide tents, blankets, food, and medicine for the worst affected areas. The government of Azad Jammu and Kashmir donated 13 acres of land to KORT in 2007 to build a purpose-built complex for orphans. KORT has provided more than 300 houses for widows and the disabled.

Jatlan does not have a fire brigade and thus relies on the nearest fire station in Mirpur which is 20 km away and can delay emergencies by up to half an hour.

Jatlan has many military and police checkpoints across the town constantly alert for threats to security and law enforcement violations related to vehicles. Checkpoints are common along the main road en route to Mirpur New City and near the main Jatlan roundabout (چوک).

The electricity supplying Jatlan originates from the Tarbela Dam and is prone to often load shedding without timetabled schedules disrupting flow of activities in the smooth operations for businesses across Pakistan. Many Mirpuris deeply resented the lack of consideration for their contribution to Pakistan's economy. Efforts have not been made to stimulate economic and infrastructural development in the Mirpur district or in Azad Kashmir as a whole. Large sums have been spent on the Mangla Dam however the benefits of Mangla's electricity were felt in Lahore, and in Karachi, long before power lines began to be installed in Mirpur. The level of royalties paid to the Azad Kashmir government for the dam's benefits has been disputed between Islamabad and Muzaffarabad.

== Notable Visits ==
Imran Khan - Former Prime Minister of Pakistan inaugurated the Kashmir Orphans Relief Trust in Jatlan

Atif Aslam - Pakistani playback singer and songwriter visited the Kashmir Orphans Relief Trust in Jatlan

Adil Rashid - English cricket player visited the Kashmir Orphans Relief Trust in Jatlan

Masood Khan - Former President of Azad Kashmir and Pakistan's Ambassador to the United Nations visited the Kashmir Orphans Relief Trust in Jatlan

Fawad Rana - Pakistani businessman who owns Lahore Qalandars inaugurated the sports complex at the Kashmir Orphans Relief Trust in Jatlan

Asad Qaiser - Former Speaker of the National Assembly of Pakistan visited the Kashmir Orphans Relief Trust in Jatlan
