= Kathar Dilawar Khan =

Coordinates: 33°25′15″N 73°38′2″E

Khatar Dilawar Khan or Kathar Dilawar is a village near Dadyal, Azad Kashmir, Pakistan. According to 1998 census of Pakistan, its population was 3,269.

== History ==
The village consists of Gakkhars. The village was originally called Kathar and renamed in 1975 when it changed to its current form.

The village was where the first Boys and Girls College was established by Dilawar Khan efforts. Also, it was the first village to have a land line telephone exchange. He founded the Kashmir Chamber of Commerce and served in 1990 as chairman of the Mirpur Development Authority.

== Dilawar Khan ==
During the Gora Raj, 'Dilawar Khan', from a Gukhur family, was a great freedom-fighter. After independence, he took a commission as an officer in the Pakistan Army. He is responsible for the merging of the AJK Regiment with the Pakistani Army (See ref: history of AJK Regiment). He retired as a Brigadier with many military and civil honors. He died in 1994. He is still considered the most known and respected person among the Azad Kashmir. The Gukhars claim him as their greatest leader.
