= Mohra Sher Shah =

Coordinates: 33°19′N 73°40′E

Mohra Sher Shah is a village in District Mirpur (Tehsil Dadyal) of Azad Kashmir, Pakistan.

== Demography ==
According to 1998 census of Pakistan, its population was 333.

== History ==
Like many villages in the Muzaffarabad region, many villagers have emigrated to the United Kingdom.
