= Mirpur Division =

Administrative division of Azad Kashmir, Pakistan

Mirpur Division میرپور ڈویژن
- Division of Azad Kashmir administered by Pakistan
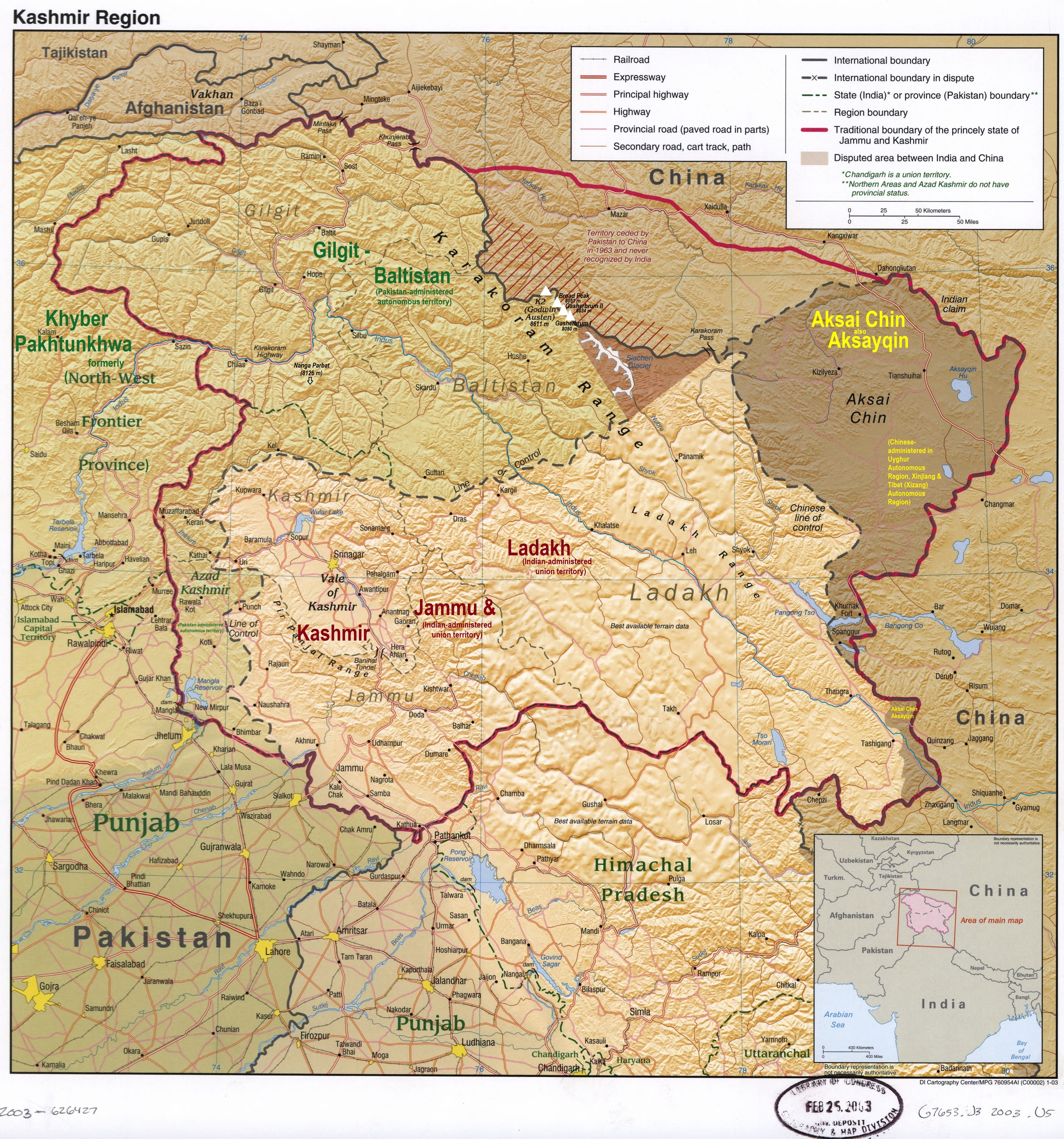
- A map showing Pakistani-administered Azad Kashmir (shaded in sage green) in the disputed Kashmir region
- Interactive map of Mirpur Division
- Coordinates (Mirpur): 33°15′N 73°56′E
- Administering country: Pakistan
- Territory: Azad Kashmir
- Capital: Mirpur

Government
  - Type: Divisional Administration
  - Regional Director: Chaudhry Shaukat Ali (PAS)
  - Regional Police Officer: Khalid Mehmood Chauhan (PSP)

Population (2017)
  - Total: 1,651,018

The Mirpur Division (Urdu: میرپور ڈِوِژن) is a first-order administrative division of the Pakistani–administered territory of Azad Kashmir in the disputed Kashmir. Mirpur is the largest division by population in Azad Kashmir. It comprises the portion of the former Mirpur District of the princely state of Jammu and Kashmir that came under Pakistani control at the end of the Indo-Pakistani War of 1947. Area wise it is second largest division of AJK after Muzaffarabad Division.

== History ==
The area of the present Mirpur Division was a part of the former princely state of Jammu and Kashmir during the British Raj and after the partition of India. After the Indo-Pakistani War of 1947, it became part of what is now Azad Kashmir. The Mirpur Division was the location of the Mirpur Massacre in November 1947.

== Demographics ==
=== Social groups ===
Gujjar is a major ethnic in Mirpur Division and they up roughly 20.45% of the total population of the division, with a population of 3,37,619. (Note: Gujjars make up 20.45% of the total population of Mirpur Division with the population in Kotli (2,70,968, 35%), Mirpur (45,620, 10%) and Bhimber (21,031, 5%) districts.) Other ethnic groups found in the division are Sayeds, Rajgan, Rajput, Jat, Qureshi and Hashmi.

=== Language ===
The main languages spoken in Poonch division are Gujari and Pahari. Gujari is the language of 20.45% of the division's population; it is spoken by 30% in Kotli, 10% in Mirpur and 5% in Bhimber districts by the Gujjar population. Other languages spoken include Urdu, Hindko, western Punjabi and Dogri.

Native languages of the Mirpur Division
1. Pahari (60.0%)
2. Gujari (20.4%)
3. Other (19.6%)

== Districts ==
Map of Mirpur Division

Currently, the Mirpur Division consists of the following districts:

District	Area (km²)	Pop. (2017)	Density (ppl/km²) (2017)	Literacy rate (2017)	Union Councils
Mirpur District	1,010	456,200	452		
Bhimber District	1,516	420,624	297		
Kotli District	1,862	774,194	416		
