= Mirpur Tehsil =

Mirpur
- Tehsil
- Country: Pakistan
- Province: Azad Kashmir
- Division: Mirpur
- District: Mirpur
- Time zone: UTC+5 (PST)

Mirpur Tehsil is an administrative subdivision (tehsil) of Mirpur District, Azad Kashmir, Pakistan.

== History ==
During British rule, Mirpur was part of the Princely state of Kashmir and Jammu. At this time Mirpur was a tehsil of Bhimber District (then part of Jammu province) During this time the idea of irrigating the lower part of Mirpur Tehsil (the Khari ilaka) from the Jhelum River had been considered.
