= Mangla Dam =

Multipurpose dam in Pakistan

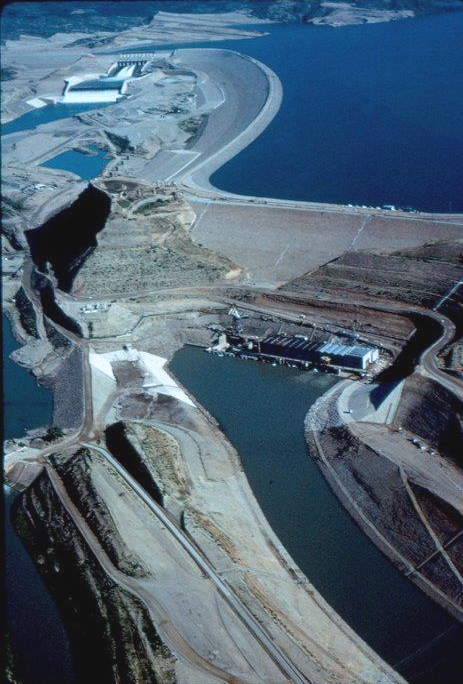
- Aerial photograph of the Mangla Dam, c. 2012

- Location of the Mangla Dam within Pakistan
- Interactive map of Mangla Dam
- Country: Pakistan
- Location: Mangla, Azad Kashmir; Jhelum, Punjab
- Status: Operational
- Construction began: 1961
- Opening date: 1967
- Construction cost: US$1.5 billion
- Owner: Government of Pakistan
- Operator: Water and Power Development Authority (WAPDA)

Dam and spillways
- Type of dam: Embankment dam
- Impounds: Jhelum River
- Height: 147 m (482 ft)
- Length: 3,140 m (10,302 ft)

Reservoir
- Creates: Mangla Lake
- Total capacity: 9.12 km^{3} (7,390,000 acre⋅ft)
- Catchment area: 33,334 km^{2} (12,870 sq mi)
- Surface area: 250 km^{2} (97 sq mi)

Power Station
- Turbines: 8 × 100 MW; 2 × 135 MW
- Installed capacity: 1,070 MW (operational); 1,310 MW (planned)

The Mangla Dam (Urdu: منگلا بند) is a multipurpose dam situated on the Jhelum River in Pakistan, lying in the Mirpur District of Azad Kashmir and the Jhelum District of Punjab. It is the seventh-largest dam in the world. The fort of Mangla, which sits at the mouth of the dam, serves as its namesake. In November 1961, the project's selected contractors were revealed; it was announced that Binnie & Partners, a British engineering firm, was going to serve as the lead designers, engineers, and inspectors for the construction of the dam (led by Geoffrey Binnie). The project was undertaken by a consortium known as the Mangla Dam Contractors, consisting of eight American construction firms sponsored by the Guy F. Atkinson Company, based in South San Francisco, California.

== Background ==
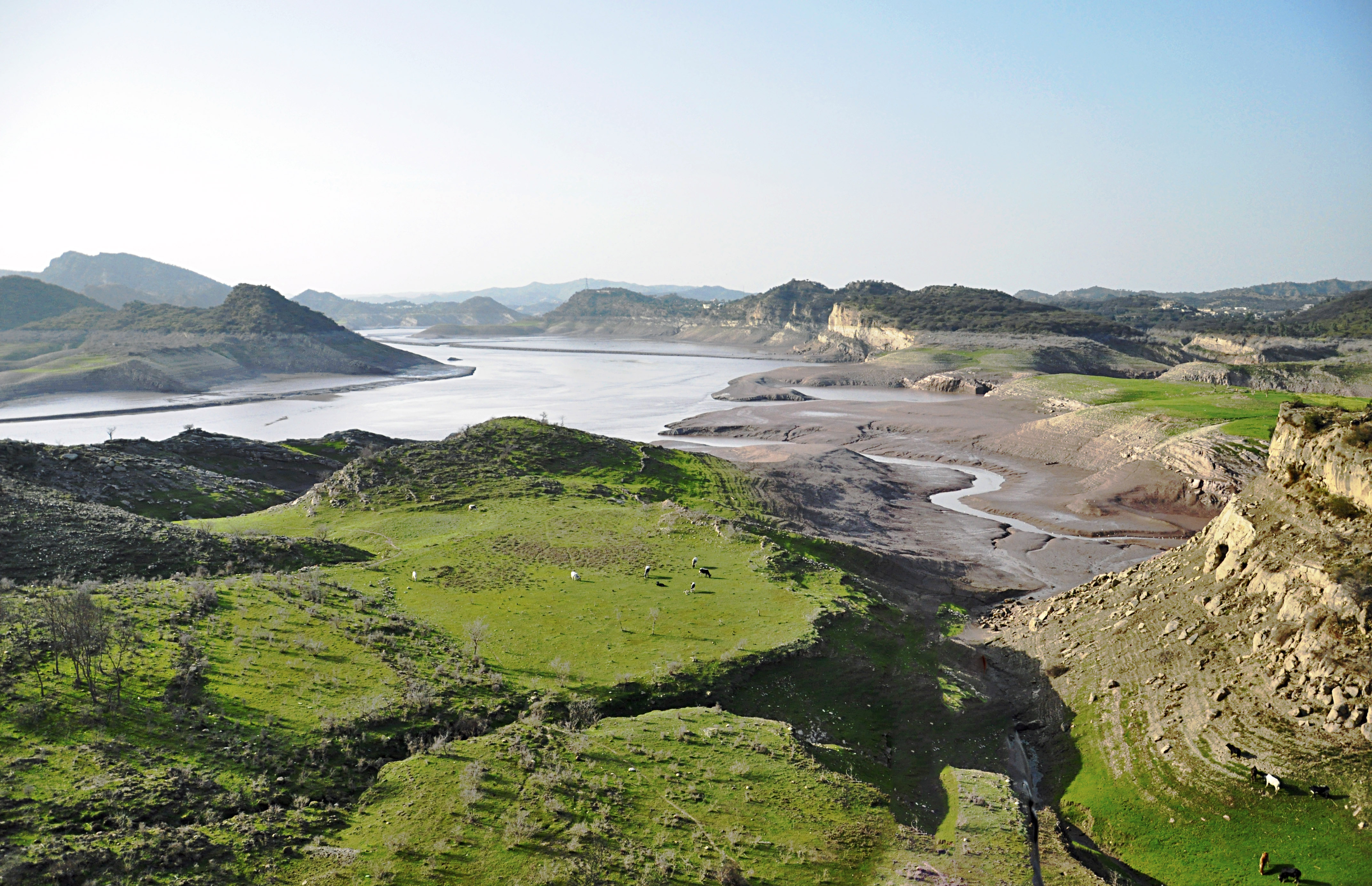
Mangla Dam from the top of Ramkot fortress

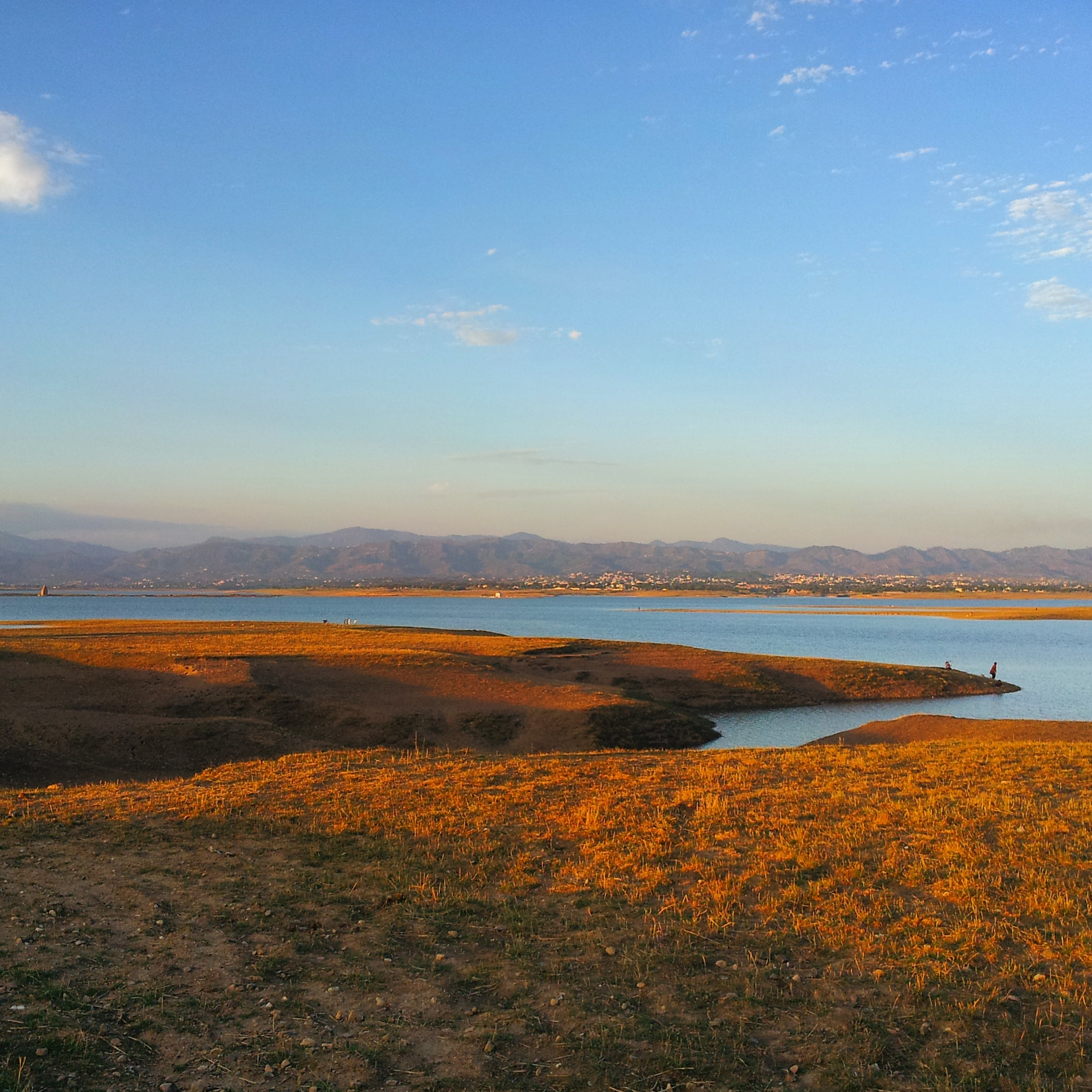
Sunset at the Mirpur city side of the lake

As part of the Indus Waters Treaty signed in 1960, India gained rights to the waters of the Ravi, Sutlej and Beas rivers, while Pakistan, in addition to the waters of the aforementioned three rivers' sections within Pakistani territory and some monetary compensation, received the rights to develop the Jhelum, Chenab and Indus river basins. Until 1967, the entire irrigation system of Pakistan was fully dependent on unregulated flows of the Indus River and its major tributaries. The agricultural yield was very low for a number of reasons, the most significant being a lack of water during critical growing periods. This problem stemmed from the seasonal variations in river flow due to monsoons and the absence of storage reservoirs to conserve the vast amounts of surplus water during those periods of high river discharge.

The Mangla Dam was the first of the two dams constructed to reduce this shortcoming and strengthen the irrigation system of the country as part of the Indus Basin Project, with the other being the Tarbela Dam situated on the Indus River in Swabi, Khyber Pakhtunkhwa.

== Construction ==
=== Cost ===
The Mangla Dam was constructed at a cost of ₨1,558.7 billion (US$14.73 billion) with funding being provided by the World Bank and the Asian Development Bank.

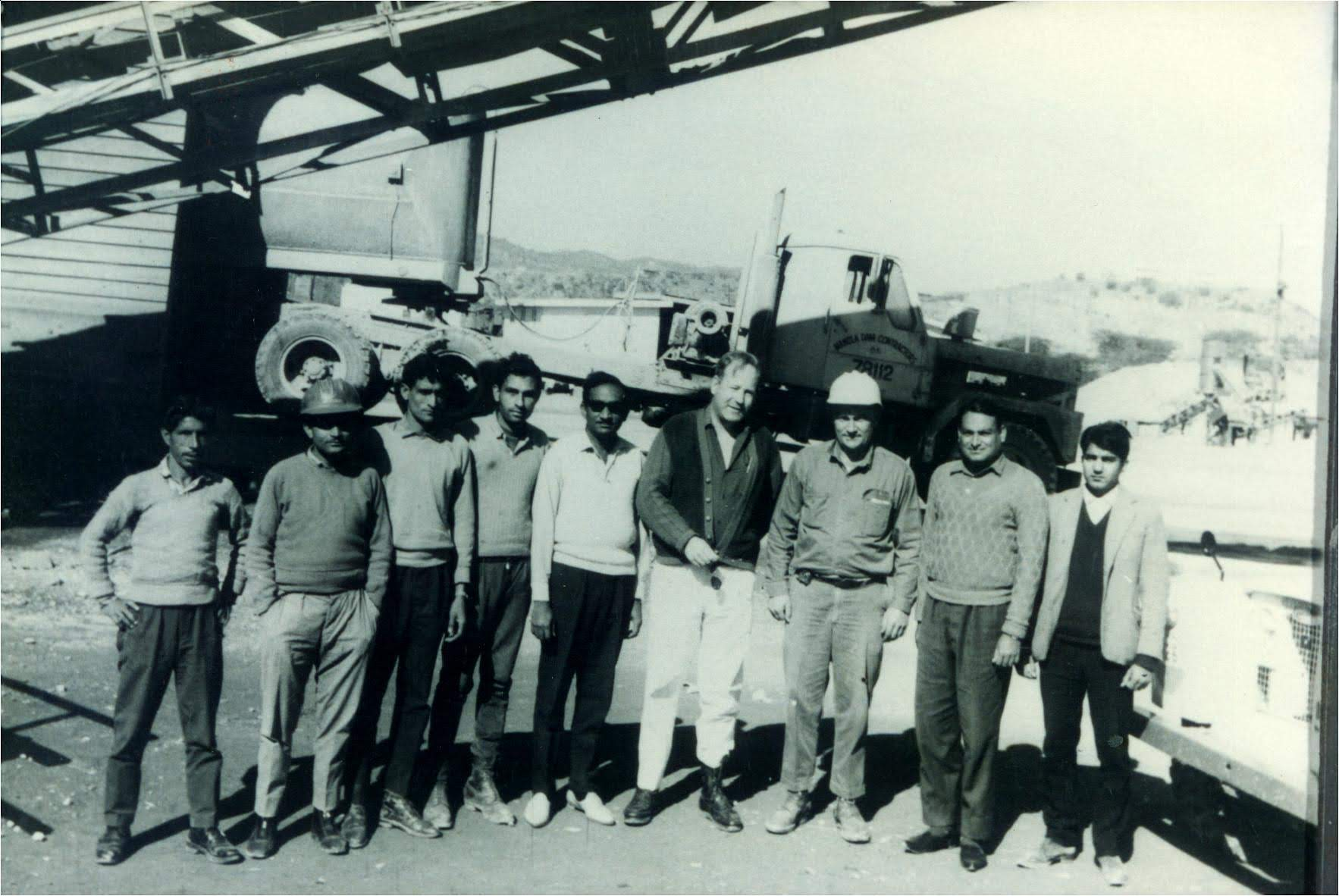
Engineers of the Mangla Dam Construction Company

=== Reservoir ===
The dam was constructed between 1961 and 1965 across the Jhelum River and Poonch River in the Mirpur District of Azad Kashmir, about 108 kilometres (67 mi) southeast of the capital city of Islamabad. The Mangla Dam components include a reservoir, main embankment, intake embankment, main spillway, emergency spillway, intake structures, five tunnels, and a power station. Besides the main dam, a dyke called Sukian – 5,200 m (17,000 ft) in length and a small dam called Jari Dam to block the Jari Nala – about 18 km (11 mi) beyond the new Mirpur town had to be constructed.

There was a total of 120 × 10^{6} cubic yards (cu yds) of excavation for the reservoir whereas the total fill amounted to 142 × 10^{6} cu yds and concrete to 1.96 × 10^{6} cu yds respectively. The main embankment is earthfill with clay as the core material. Gravel and A-type sandstone are applied on the shoulders. The maximum height of embankment above the core trench is 138 m (454 ft) and the length is 2,600 m (8,400 ft). The intake embankment is earthfill type with B-type sandstone as the core material. Gravel is applied on the shoulders. The maximum height of the intake embankment above the core trench is 80 m (262 ft) and the length is 580 m (1,900 ft).

Sukian Dam is earthfill with B-type sandstone as the core material. A-type sandstone is applied on the shoulders. The maximum height of the intake embankment above the core trench is 44 m (144 ft) and the length is 5,200 m (16,900 ft).

Jari Dam is also an earthfill type with silt as the core material. Gravel is applied on the shoulders of the dam. The maximum height of Jari dam above the core trench is 84 m (274 ft) and the length is 2,100 m (6,800 ft). The main spillway is a submerged orifice type with 9 radial gates, 11 m (36 ft) × 12 m (40 ft) each; it has a maximum capacity of 1.1 million cusecs. The emergency spillway is a weir type with an erodible bund and a maximum capacity of 0.23 million cusecs. The five tunnels are steel and concrete lined and 480 m (1,560 ft) long in bedrock. The internal diameter ranges between 7.9 m (26 ft) and 9.4 m (31 ft).

=== Power house ===
The powerhouse, which consists of turbines, generators, and transformers, has been constructed at the toe of an intake embankment at the ground surface elevation of 264 m (865 ft) SPD. The water to the powerhouse is supplied through five steel-lined tunnels of 30/26 feet diameter. Each tunnel is designed to feed two generating units. The powerhouse tailrace discharges into New Bong Canal, which has a length of 7,600 m (25,000 ft) with a discharge capacity of about 49,000 cusecs, and terminates at an automatic gate control headworks at about 12 km downstream located near old Bong Escape Headworks.

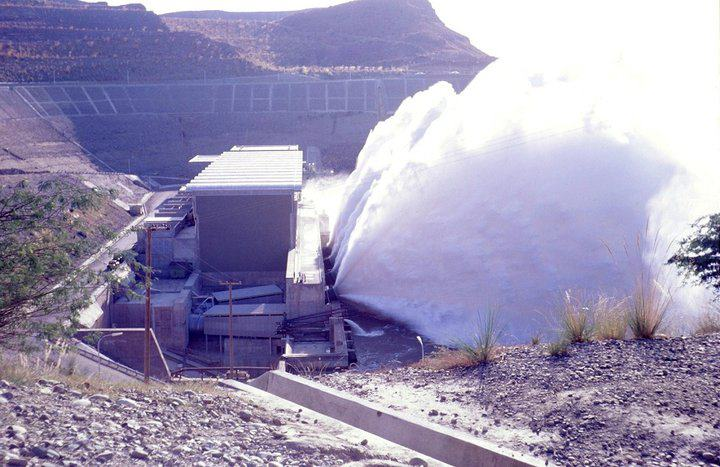
Turbine relief valve operation at Mangla Power House

There are ten vertical Francis type turbines in the powerhouse. Each of these turbines has an output of 138,00 bhp with a rated head of 295 feet of water. The first four turbines were manufactured by Mitsubishi Electric, Japan and were installed in 1969, turbines 5 and 6 are manufactured by ČKD Blansko, the Czech Republic and were installed in 1974, turbines 7-8 were manufactured by ACEC, Belgium and were installed in 1981, while the remaining two turbines are a make of Škoda, Czech Republic and were commissioned in 1994.

These turbines are connected to umbrella-type generators which have a generation capacity of 100 MW. Hitachi, Japan had provided generators for turbines 1–4 and 7-8 while Škoda generators are connected to turbines 5-6 and 9–10.

These generators are in turn connected to three-phase transformers. The transformers connected to turbines 1, 4, and 7 were manufactured by the Italy-based Savigliano. The transformers for turbine 5 and 6 are a make of Italtrafo, another Italian company, while the remaining five transformers were provided by Škoda.

== Displacement & Resettlement ==
The Government of Pakistan had agreed to pay royalties to the Government of AJK (Azad Jammu and Kashmir) for the use of the water and electricity generated by the dam. Pakistan initially committed to supplying free electricity to the entire region of Azad Kashmir and providing complimentary clean water to the city of Mirpur. However, over time, this agreement was not transparently upheld, resulting in Pakistan encountering challenges in fulfilling its financial obligations related to royalty payments for electricity and water services in Azad Kashmir. Over 280 villages and the towns of Mirpur and Dadyal were submerged and over 110,000 people were displaced from the area as a result of the dam being built. Some of those affected by the dam were given work permits for Britain by the Government of Pakistan, and as a result, in many cities in the UK the majority of the Pakistani community originates from the Dadyal-Mirpur area of Kashmir. There are 747,000 Mirpuris in the United Kingdom, and the British Mirpuri community forms about 70% of the British Pakistani community. The percentage is greater in northern cities and towns. In Bradford, an industrial town in north-west England, it is estimated that roughly three-quarters of the city's South Asian population is from Mirpur, with a sizeable population also in Birmingham. At the time, many were employed in the textile and steel mills, due to Pakistani workers willing to work for lower wages than English workers.

== Operation ==
The project was designed primarily to increase the amount of water that could be used for irrigation from the flow of the Jhelum and its tributaries. Its secondary function was to generate electrical power from the irrigation releases at the artificial head of the reservoir. The project, though not initially designed as one, also works as a flood control structure by retaining water during the flood-prone season of Monsoon.

On 5 December 1971, the dam was damaged due to a bombing raid conducted by the Indian Air Force during the Indo-Pakistani War of 1971. This was against the international convention that large water reservoirs would not be targeted in war. As a consequence, the hydro project was temporarily out of service.

From the data available in 2009, the project had generated 183.551 billion units of low-cost Hydel energy since its commissioning. The annual generation during 2008-2009 was 4797.425 Million KWh while the station shared a peak load of 1150 MW which was 8.18% of the total WAPDA system peak.

On 1 September 2013, the water level in Mangla Dam reached a record height of 377.1 m (1,237.1 ft) against the maximum conservation level of 379 m (1,242 ft). Radio Pakistan reported that "the water level in Mangla Dam has attained the maximum height of 377.1 m (1,237.1 ft) in the history and it is still increasing."

== Mangla Dam Raising Project ==
Mangla reservoir had an initial reservoir capacity of 7.25 billion cubic metres (5.88 million acre-feet), which reduced to 5.77 billion m^{3} (4.674 million acre⋅ft) in 2005 due to the sedimentation & was likely to reduce further. To counteract this phenomenon, the Mangla Dam Raising Project was started in 2004 and the main dam, spillway and its allied works were completed in 2009 at a cost of Rs. 101.384 billion. This project effectively raised the dam height by 9.1 m (30 ft) to 147 m (482 ft), thereby raising the maximum water conservation level from 366 m (1,202 ft) to 379 m (1,242 ft). This increased the dam's storage capacity from 5.56 to 9.12 billion m^{3} (4.51 to 7.39 million acre⋅ft). Besides, it is expected that after raising the height of the Mangla Dam by 30 feet, the power house will generate 12 percent additional energy per year which will increase its installed capacity from 1,000 MW to 1,120 MW.

The Mangla Dam Raising Project, however, has affected more than 40,000 people living in the vicinity of the dam. The total cost of compensation and resettlement was Rs. 70 billion. The resettlement project includes the construction of New Mirpur City, four satellite towns (Islamgarh, Chakswari, Dadyal, Siakh) with all civic amenities, the Mirpur Bypass and two bridges across River Jehlum and Bong Canal respectively.

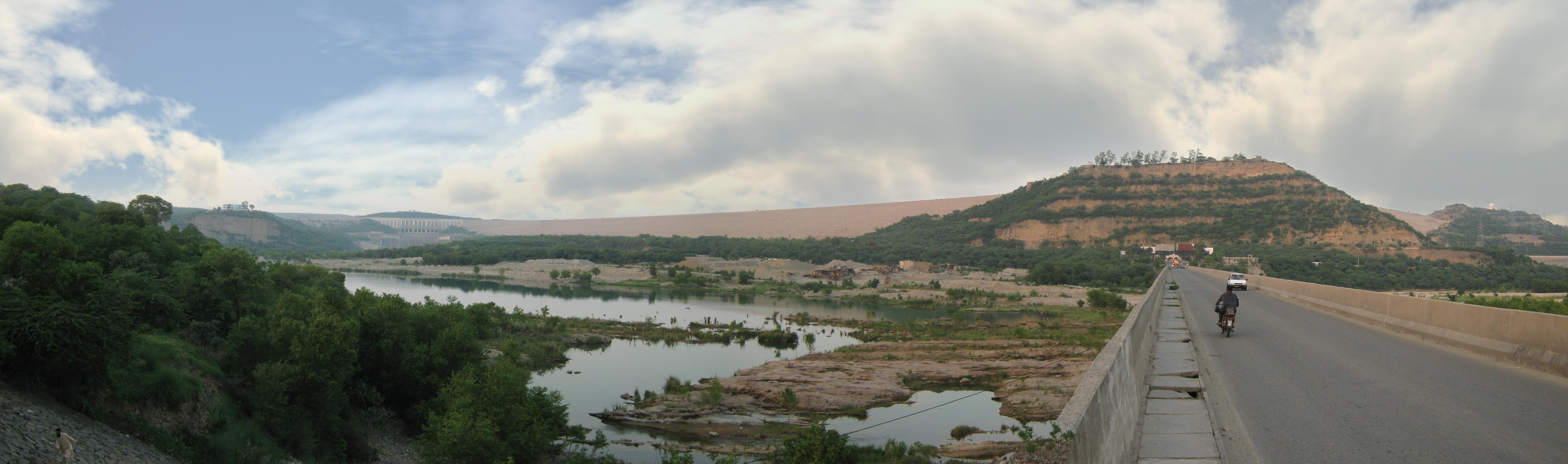
A motorbike passes over the Dhan Galli bridge, a recently constructed bridge on River Jhelum near the Mangla Dam.

== Mangla Power House Expansion Project ==
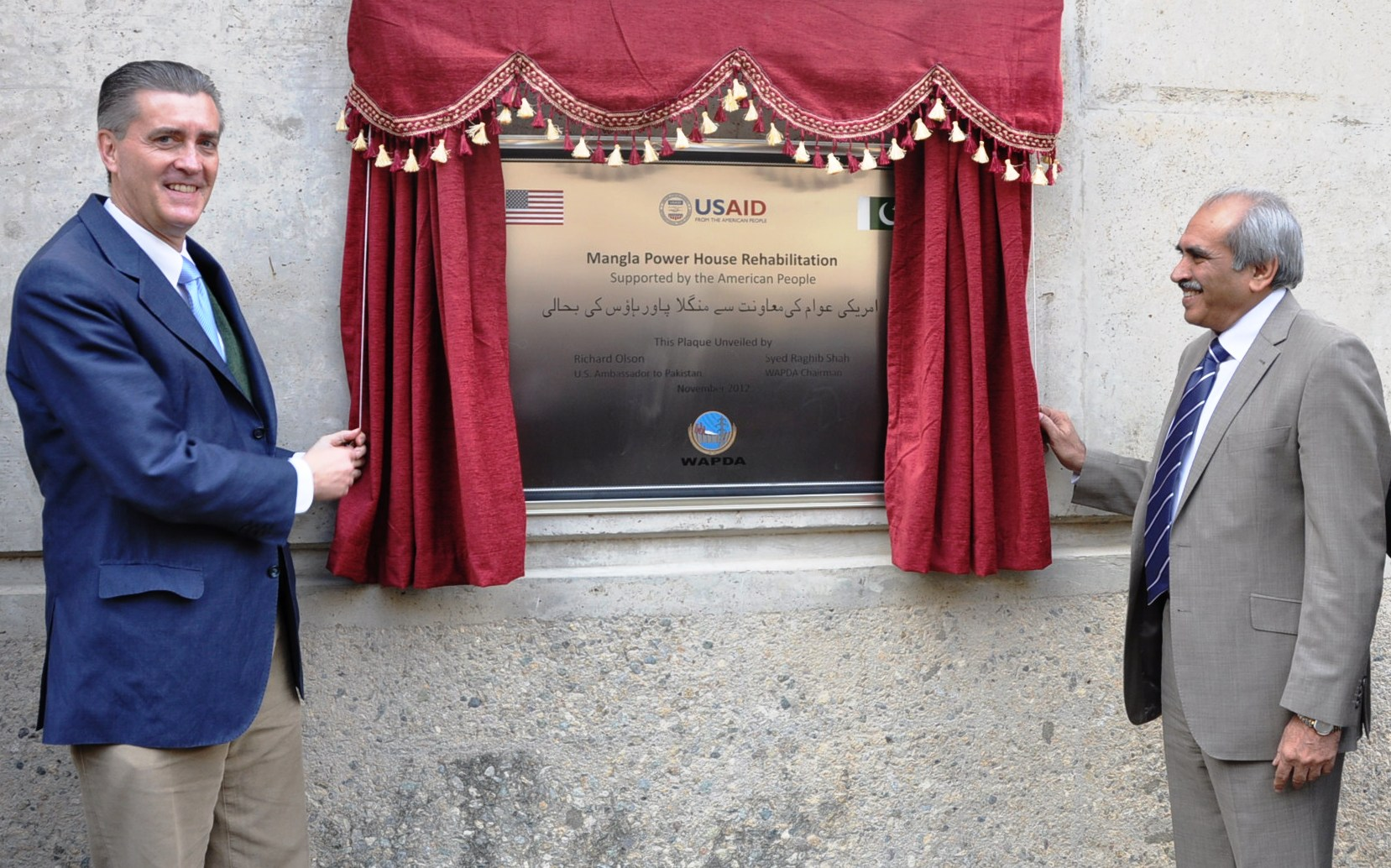
Ambassador Olson with WAPDA Chairman pledging USAID support

The dam was expanded in the era of Pervez Musharraf but it did not enhance the capacity of electric generation except increasing the level of water in the dam. In November 2012, the United States announced a grant of $150 million for the expansion of the Mangla Dam powerhouse. Under the project, $400 million would be spent on the Mangla Dam powerhouse which is estimated to provide additional production for the next 40 years. The project, when complete, will increase the power generation capacity of the Mangla Dam to 1,310 MW from the existing 1,000 MW capacity. WAPDA successfully commissioned two refurbished generating units of the Mangla Hydel Power Station on 23 May 2022, increasing their capacity from 200 MW to 270 MW.

== See also ==
- List of dams and reservoirs in Pakistan
- List of hydroelectric power station failures
