= Dadyal Tehsil =

Tehsil in Azad Kashmir, Pakistan

Dadyal ڈڈیال
- Tehsil
- Location within Azad Kashmir Location within Pakistan
- Coordinates: 33°20′48″N 73°40′21″E
- Administering country: Pakistan
- Territory: Azad Kashmir
- Division: Mirpur
- District: Mirpur

Area
  - Total: 383 km^{2} (148 sq mi)

Population (2017)
  - Total: 113,357
  - Density: 296/km^{2} (767/sq mi)
- Time zone: UTC+5 (PKT)

Dadyal (Urdu: ڈڈیال) is a tehsil of Mirpur District in Azad Kashmir, a part of Kashmir administered by Pakistan. As of the 2017 Pakistani census, the population of Dadyal was 113,357.

Dadyal saw significant violence during the 2026 Azad Kashmir protests against the regional government, with the Jammu Kashmir Joint Awami Action Committee attributing multiple protesters' deaths to shootings by police.

== History ==
A van on its way from Rawalpindi to Kotli fell into a ditch in Dadyal on 10 June 2012, resulting in six dead and several injured.

Local authorities repatriated over 2,000 Afghan refugees from Dadyal in November 2025.

From July 2026, Jammu Kashmir Joint Awami Action Committee (JKJAAC) led demonstrations in Dadyal calling for the abolition of the twelve seats in the Azad Kashmir Legislative Assembly reserved for Kashmiri refugees from India, ahead of the regional election that month. The demonstrations were part of the region-wide protests that had first erupted in June, initially due to grievances over the regional government's economic policies. The JKJAAC claimed that local police killed two protesters in Dadyal on 5 July, a claim authorities denied. One youth was killed and one policeman was critically wounded in separate shootings in Dadyal on 4 October, amid JKJAAC-led protests that continued after the election.

== Administration and geography ==
Dadyal is located in Mirpur District in Azad Kashmir, a part of Kashmir administered by Pakistan. It is a tehsil (subdistrict) whose local government has jurisdiction over 69 villages within its borders.

== Demographics ==
The 2017 Pakistani census recorded 113,357 people living in 18,144 households in Dadyal.

== Notable people ==
- Chauhdry Abdul Rashid
