= Kashmiris in Azad Kashmir =

Ethnic Kashmiris living in the Pakistani-administered territory of Azad Kashmir

Regions with significant populations
- Muzaffarabad; Neelum; Hattian

Languages
- Kashmiri; Urdu

Religion
- Islam

Related ethnic groups
- Kashmiri diaspora

Kashmiris in Azad Kashmir are the ethnic Kashmiri people who reside in Azad Kashmir, a territory which constitutes part of Pakistani-administered Kashmir since the end of the First Kashmir War. Their demographic includes up to 40,000 registered Kashmiri refugees who have fled the Kashmir Valley, located in Indian-administered Kashmir, to Pakistan since the late 1980s due to conflict in the region.

As of 2010, only around 60 percent of Kashmiri refugees had acquired Pakistani citizenship. As of 2025, according to an official communiqué, over 9,500 refugee families, comprising approximately 46,000 individuals, continued to live in poor conditions in camps and rented accommodations across various areas of Azad Kashmir, including Mirpur, Kotli, Bagh, Muzaffarabad, and Jhelum Valley.

== History and demographics ==
Christopher Snedden writes that most of the native residents of Azad Kashmir are not of Kashmiri ethnicity; rather, they could be called "Jammuites" due to their historical and cultural links with that region, which is coterminous with neighbouring Punjab and Hazara. Because the region was formerly a part of the princely state of Jammu and Kashmir and is named after it, many Azad Kashmiris have adopted the "Kashmiri" identity, whereas in an ethnolinguistic context, the term "Kashmiri" would ordinarily refer to natives of the Kashmir Valley region.

The Neelam and Leepa Valleys in northern Azad Kashmir are home to a significant Kashmiri Muslim population, as these areas border the Kashmir Valley. Many Kashmiris who support their state's accession to Pakistan or had ties to pro Pakistani separatist parties left their homes out of fear of persecution, settling on the Pakistani side of the border. Some of them came from places as distant as Srinagar, and intermarried with locals in Azad Kashmir.

=== Language ===
Kashmiri is spoken by roughly five percent of Azad Kashmir's population. According to the 1998 Pakistan Census, there were 132,450 Kashmiri speakers in Azad Kashmir. Native speakers of the language were dispersed in "pockets" throughout Azad Kashmir, particularly in the districts of Muzaffarabad (15%), Neelam (20%) and Hattian (15%), with very small minorities in Haveli (5%) and Bagh (2%). The Kashmiri language spoken in Muzaffarabad is distinct from, although still intelligible with, the Kashmiri of the Neelam Valley to the north. In Neelam Valley, Kashmiri is the second most widely spoken language and the majority language in at least a dozen or so villages, where in about half of these, it is the sole mother tongue. The Kashmiri dialect of Neelum is closer to the variety spoken in northern Kashmir Valley, particularly Kupwara.

A process of language shift is observable among Kashmiri-speakers in Azad Kashmir according to linguist Tariq Rahman, as they gradually adopt local dialects such as Pahari-Pothwari, Hindko or move towards the lingua franca Urdu. This has resulted in these languages gaining ground at the expense of Kashmiri. There have been calls for the promotion of Kashmiri at an official level; in 1983, a Kashmiri Language Committee was set up by the government to patronise Kashmiri and impart it in school-level education. However, the limited attempts at introducing the language have not been successful, and it is Urdu, rather than Kashmiri, that Kashmiri Muslims have seen as their identity symbol. Rahman notes that efforts to organise a Kashmiri language movement have been challenged by the scattered nature of the Kashmiri-speaking community in Azad Kashmir.

=== Refugees from Jammu and Kashmir ===
There are also Kashmiri populations spread out across the districts of Muzaffarabad The first wave of Kashmiri refugees arrived in 1947–48 against the backdrop of the partition of British India. More refugees poured in during the Indo-Pakistani War of 1965 and Indo-Pakistani War of 1971, followed by a third wave in the 1990s as a result of the insurgency in Jammu and Kashmir. These refugees included people from the Kupwara and Baramulla districts of Kashmir. Farooq Haider Khan, Azad Kashmir's prime minister, claimed that as many as 2.2 million people from Jammu and Kashmir sought refuge in Azad Kashmir between 1947 and 1989.

Once refugees become registered, they are eligible to buy land, own businesses and vote in Azad Kashmir elections.

== Politics ==
In the Azad Jammu and Kashmir Legislative Assembly, there are twelve seats reserved for the Jammu and Kashmiri immigrant community across Pakistan. Six of these seats are reserved for immigrants from the Kashmir Valley, and the other six for Jammu Province.

The refugees from Indian-administered Jammu and Kashmir have been historically overrepresented in the Azad Kashmir legislatures, despite their residence outside Azad Kashmir. In 1961, there were 10,000 refugees of Kashmiri origin in Pakistan, who had voting rights in elections of Azad Jammu and Kashmir. They were given an equal amount of representation in the election as the 109,000 Jammu refugees.

In 1990, there were 400,000 refugee voters, compared to 1.2 million Azad Kashmir residents. The refugees continued to receive higher representation in the legislatures compared to the residents, Kashmiris being favoured more. This was justified on the grounds of showing "solidary with the Kashmiris in the Indian-administered Kashmir". Snedden remarks that the higher representation given to refugees endows opportunities to the central government of Pakistan to influence the election results. Previously, the government of Azad Kashmir had allocated a quota system of 25 percent in government jobs for Kashmiri settlers; however, following the refugee influx of the 1990s, that quota reportedly dropped to six percent.

In Jammu and Kashmiri politics, the phrase Muzaffarabad chalo ("Let's go to Muzaffarabad") has been used as a call for public protest in response to restrictive state policies, where marchers attempt to symbolically "break the LoC" and cross to the Pakistani side of Kashmir.

== Culture ==
The Sharada Peeth temple located in Neelam Valley is one of the three holiest sites for Kashmiri Pandits. It lends its name to the Sharada script, which was extensively used in the region to record medieval Kashmiri literature. As of 2019, the Pakistani government had approved a plan to establish a cross-border corridor allowing Hindu pilgrims access to the site. Altaf Mir is a Kashmiri settler and singer from Muzaffarabad whose rendition of the classical Kashmiri poem, Ha Gulo, on Coke Studio Explorer remains widely popular and was the first Kashmiri song featured on the show. The city of Muzaffarabad is known for its Kashmiri shawls, which are an iconic product of Kashmir.

== See also ==
- Kashmiris of Punjab
