= Khatpura =

Khatpura Awan Patti
- Village
- Location within Pakistan
- Coordinates: 34.22°N 73.62°E
- Country: Pakistan
- Autonomous territory: Azad Kashmir
- District: Muzaffarabad

Population (2015 Estimated)
  - Total: 650

Languages
  - Official: Urdu
  - Native: Hindko
- Time zone: PST

Khatpura is a small village in Awan Patti, Muzaffarabad, Azad Kashmir. Khatpura is the starting village of Awan Patti. Khatpura Awan Patti is opposite to Garhi Dopatta Degree College other side of Jhelum River.

== See also ==
- Garhi Dopatta
- Kayian
