= Kotla, Bagh =

Kotla Valley
- Village
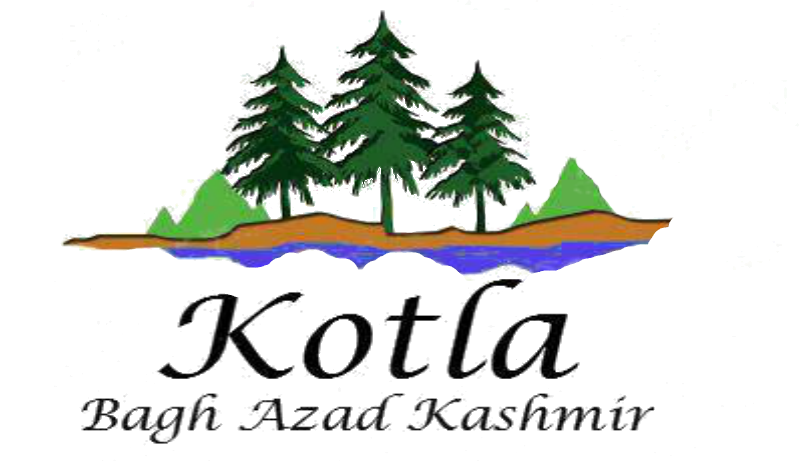
- Coat of arms

- Location within Azad Kashmir
- Coordinates: 34.0255°N 73.8291°E
- Country: Pakistan
- State: Azad Kashmir
- District: Bagh
- Elevation: 2,000 m (6,500 ft)

Languages
  - Official: Urdu
- Time zone: PST

Kotla is the name of a valley in Northern Bagh. The name of the main village of this valley is Kotla, on the basis of which the entire valley was named Kotla Valley. Kotla (Urdu: وادی کوٹلہ) is a village and tourist resort in Bagh District, Azad Kashmir, Pakistan. Kotla is 2,000 metres (6,560 ft) above sea level. Kotla contains pine trees that are hundreds of years old. It takes approximately 1 hour to drive from Bagh to Kotla.

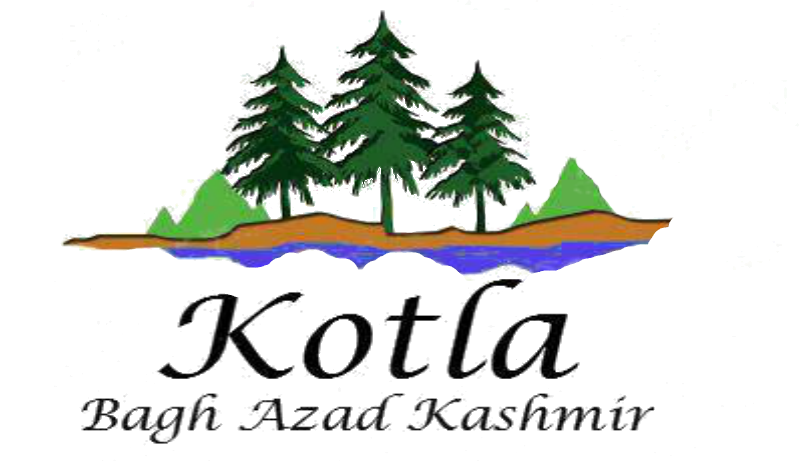
Emblem

== History ==
Kotla Valley is a historical site in Bagh District. It is said that at one time a family named Sakal lived here.The family migrated 300 years ago today due to heavy snowfall. At that time there was heavy snowfall in Bagh Valley. And until the month of August, the ice was frozen in the streams. Kotla and Bagh had dense forests. Even today, in the form of Khanthi forest, the largest forest in the Bagh Valley is located near Kotla. Traces of old times have been found in Kotla. The Sakal family cemetery is also located at Lad.

== Forests ==
Kotla is also home to some of the rarest forests in the region containing Pine Abies pindrow trees that are hundreds of years old. Due to lack of knowledge/interest, these forests are now endangered to become extinct as locals continue deforestation by cutting down trees yet local/state governments seem to have no interest in saving them.

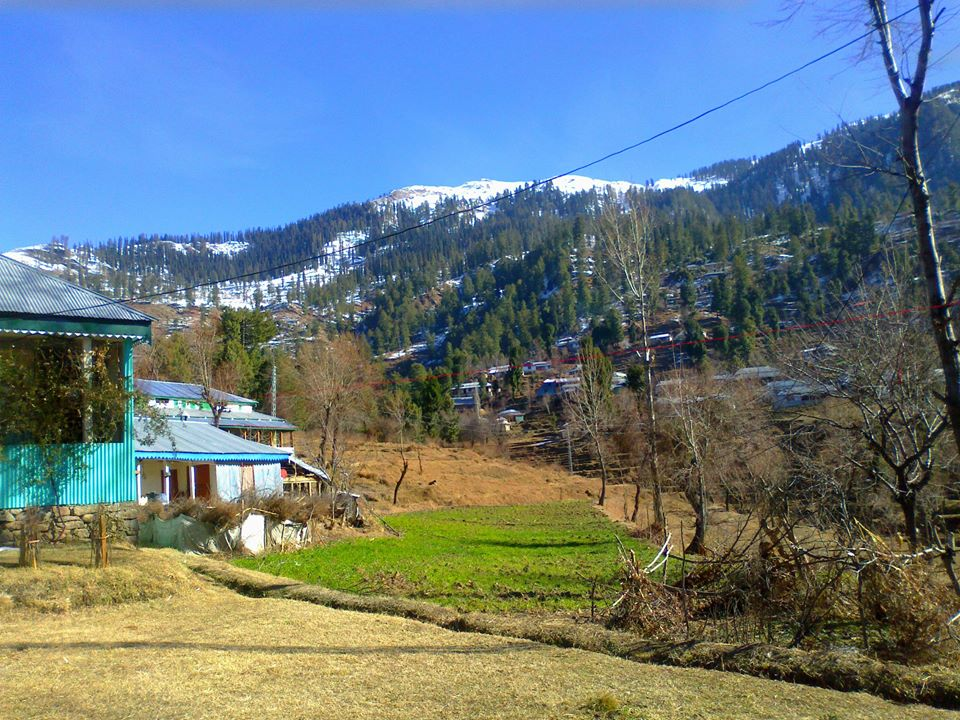
Kotla

== Geography ==
The village is situated on the confluence of two mini nullahs, Jaber Nala and Mangimar, which flow all the year round. Kotla is 18 km from the city of Bagh and is located in a valley surrounded by large mountains on three sides. On the south of the valley lies Kanthi Forest. The northern area of Kotla borders Muzaffarabad District. Kotla is the central point of the Sharqi area.

== Tourism ==
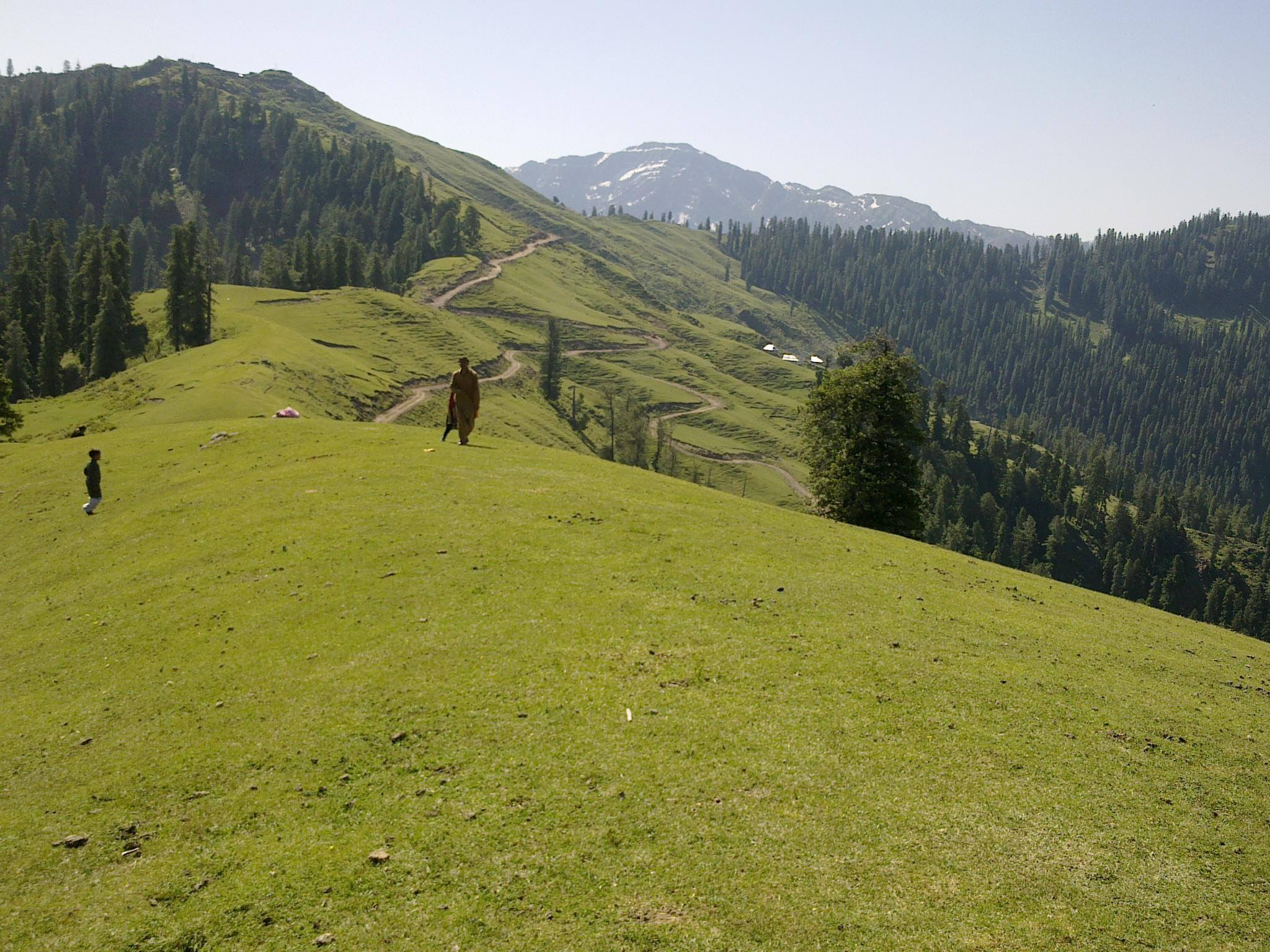
Panjal Mastan plains

Kotla is famous for its hiking trails that lead to Pir Kanthi 3,330 metres (10,930 ft), Danna meadows, Panjal Mastan plains and Ganga Choti, a mountain peak at about 3,045 metres (9,989 ft) and one of the most famous tourist attractions in AJK, Pakistan.

=== Kotla Waterfalls ===
Kotla Watterfalls is located in Kotla village. It is a very large waterfall. It is located at a height of 1,767 metres (5,798 feet) above sea level. The waterfall drops about 150 metres (490 feet) from a hanging valley that ends in overhanging cliffs above the Kotla River. The Valley of the Bagh is located at a height of 1,767 metres (5,798 feet) above sea level.

The stream, on reaching the verge of the rocky walls of the valley, forms a cascade so high that it is almost lost in spray before it reaches the level of the valley. After rain, and early in the season when fed by the melting snows, Kotla Falls is very striking. The force of the stream above the fall at such times is sufficient to carry the water clear of the precipice, and the whole mass descends in a condition of liquid dust, between spray and cloud, that sways to and fro with the gentlest breeze. In a dry summer, when the supply of water is much reduced, the effect is comparatively insignificant. The height of the cascade is between 300 and 400 ft, one of the highest in Kashmir formed of a single unbroken fall.

=== Danna Medows ===
Danna is a hilltop area situated in Tehsil Bagh in the Bagh District of Azad Kashmir. Its approximate height is about 2,900 metres (9,514 ft) above sea level. Rawalakot, Muzaffarabad, Kazinag Glacier 4,400 metres (14,500 feet) and Jhulem River can be viewed from Danna. Danna is the highest mountainous location in the northeastern area of Bagh, and near Kotla. it is the point of origin of three different mountain ridges. There are some remains of an old mazar on the highest hilltop. Danna is most accessible during the summer months; the weather is generally pleasant but becomes colder from October through March.

=== Danni Sar (Lake) ===
Danni Sar is a high-altitude lake 2,612 metres (8,570 feet) located near Kotla Bagh, Azad Kashmir.

=== Pir Kanthi ===
Pīr Kanthi is a peak and is located in near Kotla village. The elevation above sea level is 3321 meters.

=== Ganga Choti ===
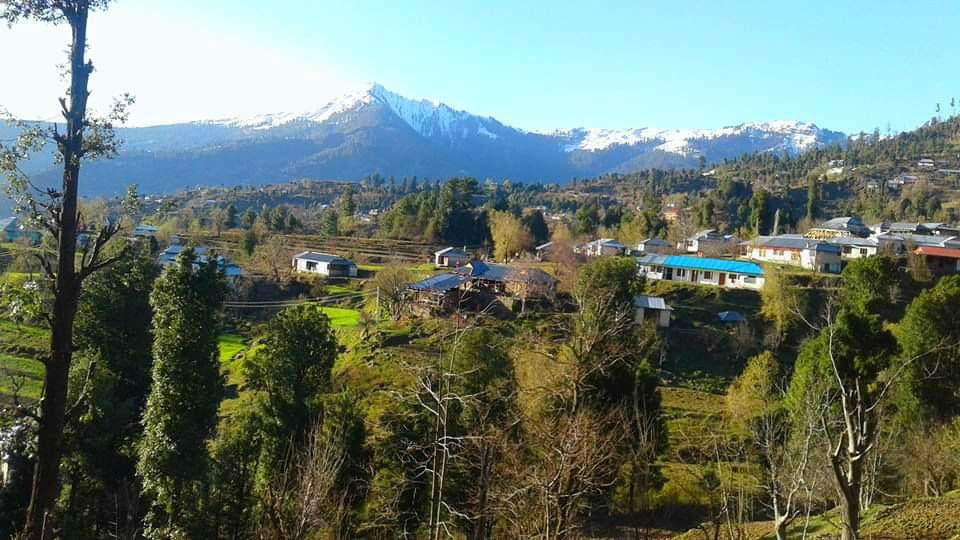
Kotla Valley

Ganga Peak, more commonly known as Ganga Choti among locals, is located in the Bagh district of Azad Kashmir. It is also visible from Bagh city and is often called "the Crown of Bagh". Ganga Choti is approachable from Sudhan Gali and Kotla, Dist Bagh, it is the four-hour trek and it is a strenuous trek since you have to gain height at every step as there is very scant flat ground on this trek. Ganga Choti is a peak village Bani Minhasan and Kotla in Bagh District, Azad Kashmir, Pakistan. It is 3,045 meters (9,989 feet) high. It is an attraction for tourists in that area. It is situated in the Pir Panjal Range.

The hike for Ganga peak starts from the town of Sudhan Gali and Kotla which is at a height of 2200 meters above sea level. From there, the peak can be reached through a 3–4 hours easy hike. People in Chanari climb Ganga from that side.

The hike to Ganga offers views of the valley and meadows. From the peak, there is a 360-degree panoramic view of the whole area. The nearest peak higher from Ganga Peak is called Pir Kanthi, which is at an aerial distance of about 10 km from it.

==== Ganga Lake ====
Ganga Lake or Ganga Sar is a high-altitude lake 2,942 metres (9,652 feet) located in the Bagh Valley, Azad Kashmir, Pakistan. It is near Ganga Choti Peak in the Himalayan (Pir Panjal) range. The lake is accessible from Bagh by a Jeep track.

== Peaks ==
There are nine peaks around the Kotla Valley.

Serial no	Peak	Height in m	Height in ft
01	Bisali Peak	3400	11154
02	Pir Kanthi	3331	10930
03	Ganga Choti	3044	9989
04	Kobra	3009	9875
05	Naza Gali	2791	9858
06	Nanga Pir Peak	2611	8576
07	Danna	2880	9450
08	Kafar Peak	3320	10892
09	Sank	3300	10825

== Culture ==
The culture of Kotla Village Azad Kashmir has many similarities to that of the northern Punjabi (Potohar) culture in Punjab province, The Peshawari turban is worn by some. The traditional dress of the women is the shalwar kameez in Pahari style.

== Climate ==
Kotla features a humid subtropical climate (Cwa) under the Köppen climate classification. Kotla has mild to warm temperatures during the spring and autumn, humid temperatures during summer and cold to snowy during the winter. The temperature can rise as high as 38 °C (100 °F) during the mid-summer months and drop below −10 °C (14 °F) during the winter months. Snowfall can occur in December and January, while most rainfall occurs during the monsoon season stretching from July to September.

Climate data for Kotla, Azad Kashmir
Month	Jan	Feb	Mar	Apr	May	Jun	Jul	Aug	Sep	Oct	Nov	Dec	Year
Record high °C (°F)	19.6 (67.3)	20.9 (69.6)	30.4 (86.7)	41 (106)	45 (113)	40.6 (105.1)	43.2 (109.8)	40 (104)	36.4 (97.5)	35.9 (96.6)	33.3 (91.9)	25.9 (78.6)	45 (113)
Mean daily maximum °C (°F)	17.3 (63.1)	19.8 (67.6)	24.7 (76.5)	30.6 (87.1)	36.3 (97.3)	38.1 (100.6)	34.8 (94.6)	33.5 (92.3)	33.2 (91.8)	30.4 (86.7)	25.2 (77.4)	19.7 (67.5)	28.6 (83.5)
Mean daily minimum °C (°F)	3.8 (38.8)	6.7 (44.1)	11.1 (52.0)	15.9 (60.6)	21 (70)	23.8 (74.8)	24.3 (75.7)	23.6 (74.5)	21.1 (70.0)	14.8 (58.6)	8.8 (47.8)	5 (41)	15.0 (59.0)
Record low °C (°F)	−10 (14)	−5.6 (21.9)	−3.8 (25.2)	1.3 (34.3)	10 (50)	13 (55)	12 (54)	12.7 (54.9)	13 (55)	1.9 (35.4)	0 (32)	−3.3 (26.1)	−10 (14)
Average rainfall mm (inches)	24.9 (0.98)	30.8 (1.21)	31.2 (1.23)	20.1 (0.79)	14.4 (0.57)	44.1 (1.74)	112.8 (4.44)	136.3 (5.37)	43.8 (1.72)	15.7 (0.62)	14.5 (0.57)	19.1 (0.75)	507.7 (19.99)

== Sports ==
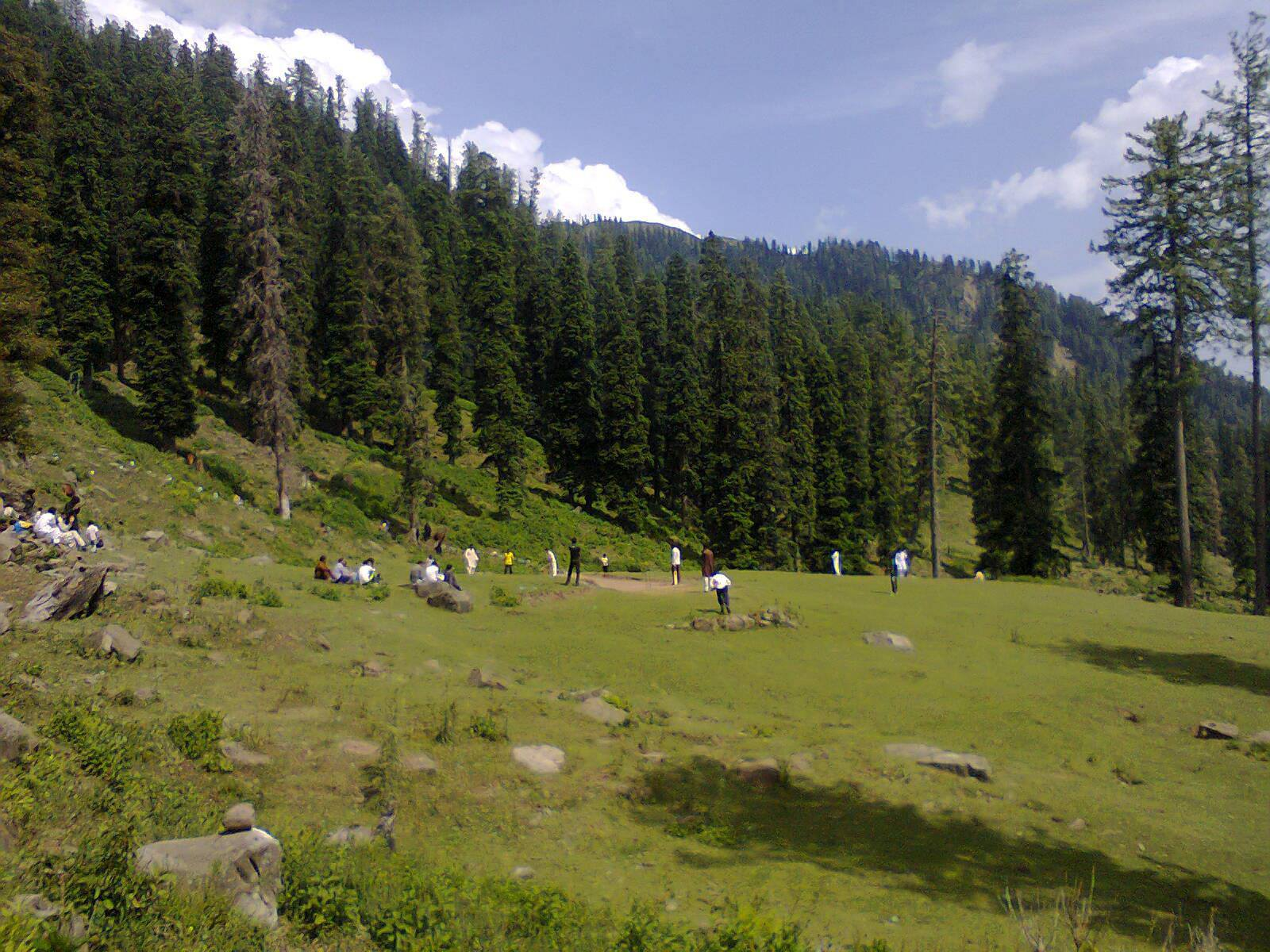
Bagla Cricket Ground (altitude 8135 feet)

There is a cricket ground near the Dana Medows known as Goralay Bagly Ground, located between two mountains. Every year in June a cricket tournament is held there in which sixteen teams of District Bagh and Mzd participate.

== Earthquake of 2005 ==
Kotla and its surrounding villages were totally destroyed by the 2005 Kashmir earthquake, hundreds of people were killed or injured by this quake. 100% population was left homeless. Most of the houses have been reconstructed though with the help of the Governments of Pakistan, Azad Kashmir and local and international NGOs.

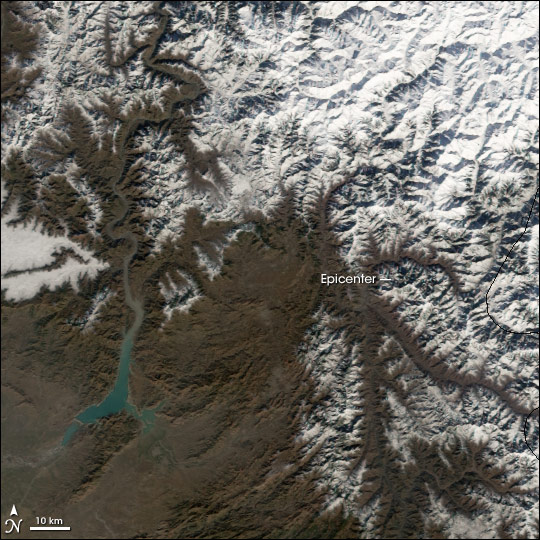
Heavy snowfall in the region around the epicentre, shown here in a January 6, 2006 NASA satellite image, hampered the relief efforts which began shortly after the earthquake struck.
