= List of tehsils of Azad Kashmir =

Administrative subdivisions of Azad Kashmir in Pakistan

Tehsils are third-order administrative divisions of Azad Kashmir, after divisions and districts. Tehsils are divided into fourth-order administrative divisions known as union councils. The following is a list of all of the tehsils of Azad Kashmir.

== Table ==
| Tehsil | Area (km^{2}) | Population (2017) | Density (people/km2) (2017) | Literacy Rate (2017) | District | Division |
|---|---|---|---|---|---|---|
| Kotli Tehsil | | 4,00,000 | | | Kotli District | Mirpur Division |
| Khuiratta Tehsil | | 70,000+ | | | Kotli District | Mirpur Division |
| Fatehpur Thakiala Tehsil | | 60,000+ | | | Kotli District | Mirpur Division |
| Sehnsa Tehsil | | 80,000+ | | | Kotli District | Mirpur Division |
| Charhoi Tehsil | | 80,000+ | | | Kotli District | Mirpur Division |
| Duliah Jattan Tehsil | | 70,000+ | | | Kotli District | Mirpur Division |
| Dadyal Tehsil | | 1,20,000 | | | Mirpur District | Mirpur Division |
| Mirpur Tehsil | | 5,00,000 | | | Mirpur District | Mirpur Division |
| Islamgarh Tehsil | | 80,000 | | | Mirpur District | Mirpur Division |
| Bhimber Tehsil | | 3,00,000 | | | Bhimber District | Mirpur Division |
| Barnala Tehsil | | 1,00,000 | | | Bhimber District | Mirpur Division |
| Samahni Tehsil | | 90,000 | | | Bhimber District | Mirpur Division |
| Hattian Bala Tehsil | | 2,00,000 | | | Hattian Bala District | Muzaffarabad Division |
| Chikkar Tehsil | | 70,000 | | | Hattian Bala District | Muzaffarabad Division |
| Leepa Tehsil | | 60,000 | | | Hattian Bala District | Muzaffarabad Division |
| Muzaffarabad Tehsil | | 5,00,000+ | | | Muzaffarabad District | Muzaffarabad Division |
| Nasirabad Tehsil | | 80,000+ | | | Muzaffarabad District | Muzaffarabad Division |
| Athmuqam Tehsil | | 2,00,000 | | | Neelum District | Muzaffarabad Division |
| Sharda Tehsil | | 50,000 | | | Neelum District | Muzaffarabad Division |
| Bagh Tehsil | | 2,00,000 | | | Bagh District | Poonch Division |
| Dhirkot Tehsil | | 1,00,000+ | | | Bagh District | Poonch Division |
| Hari Ghel Tehsil | | 70,000 | | | Bagh District | Poonch Division |
| Rera Tehsil | | 90,000 | | | Bagh District | Poonch Division |
| Birpani Tehsil | | 50,000 | | | Bagh District | Poonch Division |
| Haveli Tehsil | | 1,50,000 | | | Haveli District | Poonch Division |
| Khurshidabad Tehsil | | 70,000 | | | Haveli District | Poonch Division |
| Mumtazabad Tehsil | | 60,000 | | | Haveli District | Poonch Division |
| Abbaspur Tehsil | | 1,00,000 | | | Poonch District | Poonch Division |
| Hajira Tehsil | | 90,000+ | | | Poonch District | Poonch Division |
| Rawalakot Tehsil | | 4,00,000 | | | Poonch District | Poonch Division |
| Thorar Tehsil | | 80,000 | | | Poonch District | Poonch Division |
| Balouch Tehsil | | 90,000 | | | Sudhnoti District | Poonch Division |
| Mang Tehsil | | 80,000 | | | Sudhnoti District | Poonch Division |
| Pallandri Tehsil | | 3,00,000 | | | Sudhnoti District | Poonch Division |
| Tarar Khel Tehsil | | 80,000 | | | Sudhnoti District | Poonch Division |

== See also ==
- List of tehsils in Pakistan
