= Dao Khan =

- Village
- Location within Azad Kashmir
- Coordinates: 34.2643°N 73.8239°E
- Country: Pakistan
- Territory: Azad Kashmir
- District: Hattian Bala
- Elevation: 2,490 m (8,170 ft)

Languages
  - Official: Urdu
- Time zone: PST

Dao Khan is a village and tourist spot in Leepa Valley, Hattian Bala District of Azad Kashmir. It is located 71 kilometers (44 mi) from Muzaffarabad and 4 kilometers (2.5 mi) from Reshian at the altitude of 2,490 meters (8,170 ft).

Rest houses of AJK Tourism & Archaeology Department and AJK Forest Department are located here for tourists stay.

The village is accessible from Reshian by car and jeep.
