= List of districts in Azad Kashmir =

Districts of Pakistani-administered Kashmir

Districts of Azad Kashmir
- Map of the districts of Azad Kashmir
- Location: Azad Kashmir
- Number: 10 (as of as of 2009)
- Populations: 152,124 (Haveli District) – 650,370 (Muzaffarabad District)
- Areas: 569 square kilometres (220 sq mi) (Sudhnati District) – 3,621 square kilometres (1,398 sq mi) (Neelum District)
- Government: District Government; City District Government; Zilla Council
- Subdivisions: Tehsils

Azad Kashmir is an administrative territory of the Pakistani-administered Kashmir. It has 10 first-order administrative divisions called "districts," and each district is divided into tehsils. Geographically, the northern districts of Azad Kashmir encompass the lower part of the Himalayas. The southern districts of Azad Kashmir, which consist of the Bhimber, Kotli, and Mirpur districts have extremely hot weather in the summer and moderately cold weather in the winter. Azad Kashmir receives rainfall in both the winter and summer seasons, with Muzaffarabad being among the wettest areas of Azad Kashmir. The culture in the northern districts is similar to that of the people of Gilgit-Baltistan, where Balti, Gujari and other languages are spoken. In the central districts like Poonch, etc., the Hindko and Gujari languages are spoken, and in the southern districts, the culture of the people is similar to that of the Potoharis.

== List of districts ==
District	Headquarter	Area (km^{2})	Population (2017)	Density (people/km^{2})	Literacy Rate (2023)	Map
Muzaffarabad	Muzaffarabad	1,642	650,370	396		
Hattian Bala	Hattian Bala	854	230,529	270		
Neelam Valley	Athmuqam	3,621	191,251	53		
Mirpur	Mirpur	1,010	456,200	452		
Bhimber	Bhimber	1,516	420,624	277		
Kotli	Kotli	1,862	774,194	416		
Poonch	Rawalakot	855	500,571	585		
Bagh	Bagh	770	371,919	483		
Haveli	Forward Kahuta	598	152,124	254		
Sudhanoti	Pallandari	569	297,584	523		
Total		13,297	4,045,367			

== History ==
In 1985 Azad Kashmir consisted of 4 districts, Muzaffarabad, Poonch, Mirpur and Kotli Hattian was a subdivision of Muzaffarabad, Bhimber was a subdivision of Mirpur, Bagh and Haveli were subdivisions of Poonch. In 1987 Bagh became a separate district from Poonch with Haveli as a subdivion - the other districts remained unchanged.

In 1996, Azad Kashmir consisted of 7 districts, Muzaffarabad, Bagh, Poonch, Pallandri, Mirpur, Kotli and Bhimber. In 2006, Azad Kashmir consisted of 8 districts, Muzaffarabad, Neelum, Mirpur, Bhimber, Kotli, Poonch, Bagh and Sudhnuti (formerly Pallandri). The current set-up of 10 districts was established in 2009.

== See also ==
- List of tehsils of Azad Kashmir
- List of districts in Gilgit-Baltistan
- List of districts of Jammu and Kashmir
- List of districts of Ladakh
