= Jhelum Valley (Kashmir) =

Jhelum Valley وادی جہلم
- Valley
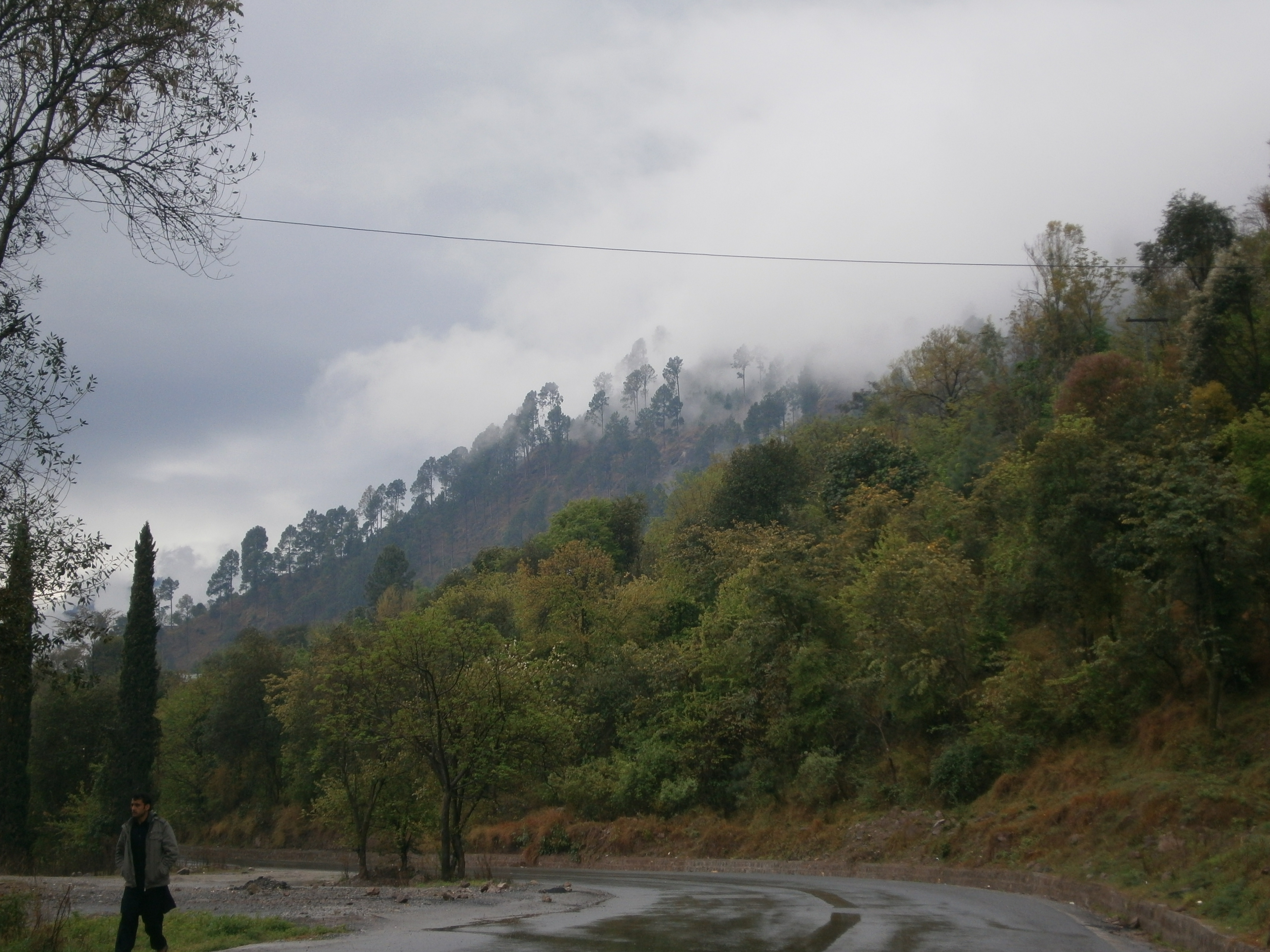

- Location within Azad Kashmir
- Coordinates: 34.1691°N 73.7432°E
- Country: Pakistan
- Territory: Azad Kashmir
- District: Hattian Bala

Languages
  - Official: Urdu
- Time zone: UTC+05:00 (PST)

Jhelum Valley (Urdu: وادی جہلم) is located along the course of the Jhelum River, in the Jhelum Valley District of Azad Jammu and Kashmir. Spanning approximately 50 kilometers (31 mi), the valley is known for its proximity to the Line of Control (LoC) in the Kashmir region disputed between Pakistan and India. Hattian Bala serves as both the administrative center of the valley and the district headquarters.

== Tourist attractions ==
- Chinari and Garhi Dupatta: Famous for their panoramic views along the Jhelum River.
- Chikar: A hill station which provides access to ZalZall Lake, which was formed after the 2005 Kashmir earthquake due to landslides obstructing a river's path.
- Noon Bagla: A dense forest area located 10 km from Chikar.
- Awan Patti, Chakothi and Kotla: Tourist-friendly attractions close to the LoC.

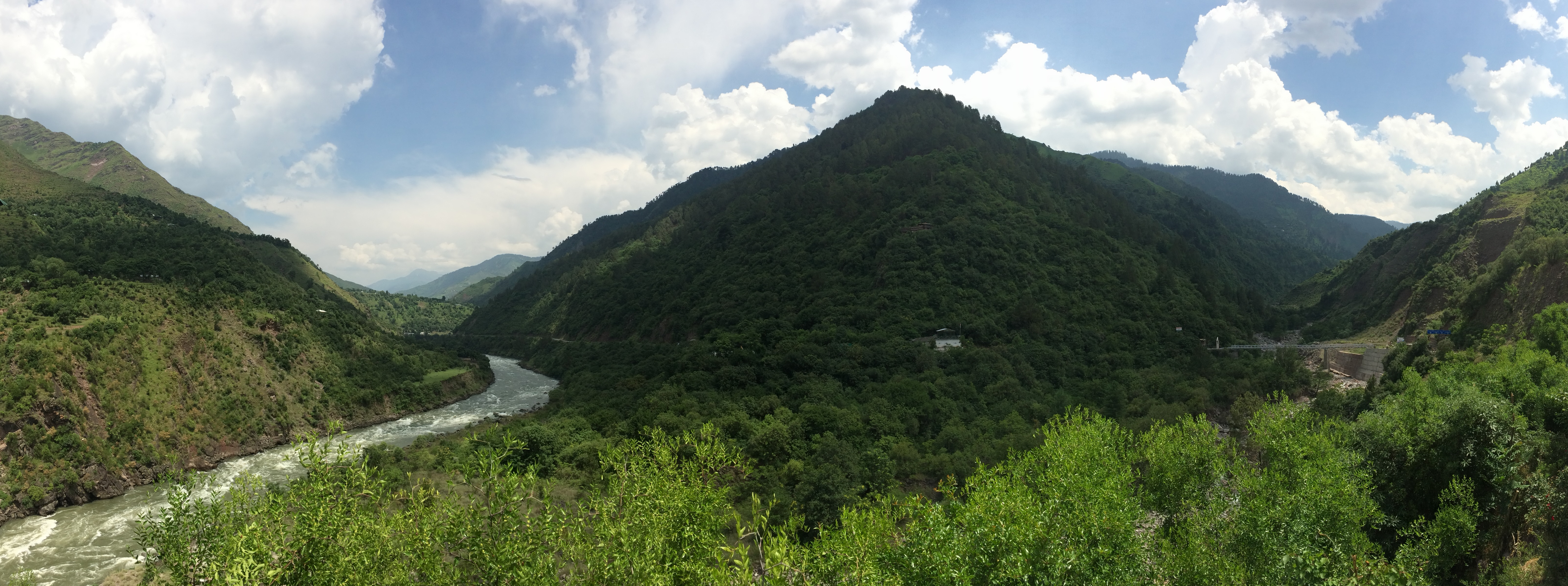
Chakothi, Jhelum Valley

== Infrastructure and facilities ==
The valley is connected to Muzaffarabad by a road, providing access to its many towns and tourist sites. Basic amenities such as hotels, rest houses, health facilities, and educational institutes are available in most of the valley's populated areas. Tourists in the valley can also access local post offices and landline telephone services.

Due to the ongoing territorial dispute between Pakistan and India, some parts of the valley, especially those near the LoC, have restricted access. However, the primary tourist areas remain accessible throughout the year.

== See also ==
- Tourism in Azad Kashmir
- Azad Kashmir
- Line of Control
