= Awan Patti =

Awan Patti (Patti Awanan) اعوان پٹی
- Town
- Location within Pakistan
- Coordinates: 34.25°N 73.66°E
- Country: Pakistan
- Autonomous territory: Azad Kashmir
- District: Muzaffarabad

Population (2018 Estimated)
  - Total: 15,000

Languages
  - Official: Urdu
  - Native: Hindko
- Time zone: PST

Awan Patti Urdu: اعوان پٹی (Patti Awanan) is a valley in Muzaffarabad district, Azad Kashmir, Pakistan. It is located 25 kilometres (16 mi) southeast of Muzaffarabad city, on the right bank of the Jhelum River and opposite of Garhi Dupatta.

== Sub villages in Awan Patti ==
- Khatpura
- Kholi an
- Kayian
- Bandi Siftu
- NAKAH
- Babela
- Qaid Abad
- Dhara 1
- Dhara 2
- Kals Syedan
- Dakhan
- Kaindlan
- Hadrian
- Nakkah
- Ratakha
- Sokar
- Rially
- Patti
- Bandi peer baksh
- sultan pur
- Haripur hazara

== Education ==
There are numerous schools, including a Government Girls High School
and a similar school for boys.

== Transport ==
Awan Patti is well connected by road with the rest of Muzaffarabad. It has no direct train link but the nearest railway station is Rawalpindi railway station. The proposed new railway line from Islamabad to Muzaffarabad will pass through Khatpura Awan Patti on its way to Srinagar. Garhi Dupatta station will be built in Khat Pura Awan Patti.

== Timber mafia ==
Protected forest areas of Awan Patti are vulnerable to illegal logging by timber mafias that have coopted or intimidated forestry officials, local politicians, businesses and citizens. Clear-cutting is sometimes covered-up by officials who report fictitious forest fires. Many studies indicate large losses of forest cover to indiscriminate logging by the mafias, with over a hundred canals in the environs of Awan Patti being illegally transferred by the forest department directly to them. Besides the environmental degradation, public financial losses can be substantial.

== See also ==
- Garhi Dupatta
- Jhelum Valley
