= Mahldara =

Village in Pakistan

Coordinates: 34°02′N 73°48′E

Mahldara is a big village of Bagh District, Azad Kashmir, Pakistan. It is located 10 km north of Bagh city and at an altitude of 4000 metres.

== Location ==
Mahldara is located at Latitude 34.04107 and Longitude 73.80706 and is about 110 kilometres from Kohala, and about 180 kilometres from Islamabad. From Mahldara Ganga Choti and Prat can be viewed. The population of Mahldara is about 12,000 which includes many tribes but the majors are Minhas Raputs. There are two high schools for boys and one for girls.

== 2005 earthquake ==
Mahldara and its surrounding villages and towns were totally destroyed from the 2005 Kashmir earthquake, resulting in hundreds dead and everyone homeless. Most houses have been reconstructed with the help of the Governments of Pakistan, Azad Kashmir, as well as local and international NGOs. The Earthquake also destroyed the local girls high school which was also reconstructed.
