= Bani Hafiz =

Bani Hāfiz
- Village
- Location within Azad Kashmir
- Coordinates: 34°08′15″N 73°44′45″E
- Country: Pakistan
- Region: Azad Kashmir
- District: Hattian Bala
- Time zone: UTC+05:00 (PKT)

Bani Hafiz is a small village in Hattian Bala district of Jhelum valley in the Pakistani region of Azad Jammu and Kashmir.

== History ==
Before the name of Bani Hafiz it was called as Bania Sharif. Muhammad Ishaq zaffar was a former president of Pakistan peoples party AJK and senior minister of AJK government from 1996 to 2001. He also remained 17th acting president of AJK. Zaffar also remained speaker of AJK assembly. The land of Bani Hafiz was given as a gift to Hafiz Jamal ud din by the Raja of Salmia in the late 1700s. Hafiz Jamal was a religious and spiritual person. He used to mediate in the jungle in bani Hafiz. Hafiz Jamal had two son's Hafiz Muhammad Ghous and Hafiz Muhammad Jee. Hafiz Muhammad Ghous the elder one shifted to Ban Khawra a small village in Lamnian on the other side of the river Jehlum. Hafiz Muhammad Jee stayed at Bani Hafiz. The family of Hafiz Muhmmad Jee propagated in Bani Hafiz. Hafiz Muhammad Jee's three sons Hafiz Abdul Qudus known as Molvi Bajee, Hafiz Muhammad Yunus and Hafiz Abdul Latif stayed and prosperous in Bani Hafiz. Hafiz Muhammad Shafi son of Hafiz Muhammad Qudous(Molvi baji) is a famous saint of Muzaffarabad region and many people come to him to seek spiritual guidance. Sahibzada Irfan Danish was son of Hafiz Mian Muhammad Yunus. Irfan Danish remained member of constituent assembly from 1990 to 1991. Ishaq Zaffar was son of Hafiz Abdul Latif.Anwar Kasur daughter of Hafiz Muhammad Yunus remained principal of degree college for girls Hattian bala. The institute is named after her. Bani Hafiz is a very scenic place with natural springs and trees. The Family of bani hafiz is renowned spiritual people of Azad Kashmir. There are doctors, engineers, managers, teachers, government servants and lawyers in the family of Bani Hafiz other than politicians. Many people are settled in foreign countries from Bani Hafiz. The female literacy rate in Bani Hafiz is above 90%. Urs (religious festival) of Hafiz Jamal and his son's are carried out around the year in Bani Hafiz. People from distant areas come to celebrate Urs of these personalities.
