= Chananian =

- Village
- Location within Azad Kashmir Location within Pakistan
- Coordinates: 34.2545°N 73.9417°E
- Country: Pakistan
- Region: Azad Kashmir
- District: Hattian Bala
- Elevation: 2,226 m (7,303 ft)

Population
  - Total: about 400 people

Languages
  - Official: Urdu
- Time zone: PST

Chananian is a village opposite to Leepa Valley in Hattian Bala District of Azad Kashmir, Pakistan. It is located 103 kilometers (64 mi) from Muzaffarabad and 36 kilometers (22 mi) from Reshian at an altitude of 2,226 meters (7,303 ft). Situated at the height of 2,226 metres (7,303 ft) near the Line of Control, there are thick pine forests surrounding the village.
