= Ratakha =

Village in Azad Kashmir, Pakistan

Ratakha پاکستان: Urduپاکستان; Hindkoہندکو; Kashmir languageकॉशुर
- Village
- Flag
- Interactive map of Ratakha
- Coordinates: 34.25°N 73.660004°E
- Time zone: UTC+5

Artakha is a small village located in Awan Patti, Muzaffarabad district, Azad Kashmir, Pakistan.
