= Ministry of Kashmir Affairs, Gilgit-Baltistan and States and Frontier Regions =

Government ministry of Pakistan

Ministry of Kashmir Affairs, Gilgit-Baltistan, and States and Frontier Regions
- وزارت امور کشمیر، گلگت بلتستان و ریاستیں و سرحدی امور

Agency overview
- Formed: April 1949; 77 years ago
- Jurisdiction: Government of Pakistan
- Headquarters: Islamabad, Islamabad Capital Territory, Pakistan
- Employees: 173 (58 officers, 115 staff members)
- Annual budget: ₨.80 crore (US$5 million) (2018–19)
- Minister responsible: Amir Muqam
- Agency executive: Tariq Mahmood Pasha, Federal Secretary
- Child agencies: K & GB Wing; Planning Wing
- Website: www.kana.gov.pk

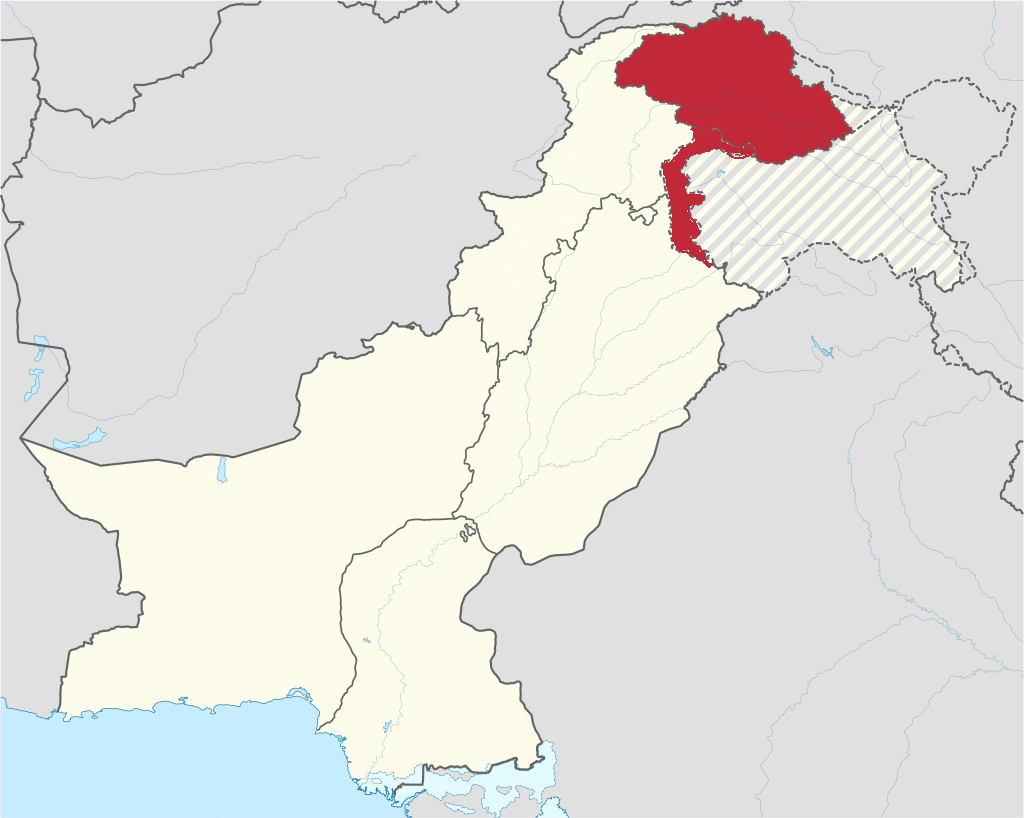
Pakistani-administered Kashmir, highlighted red, shown in relation to the rest of Pakistan

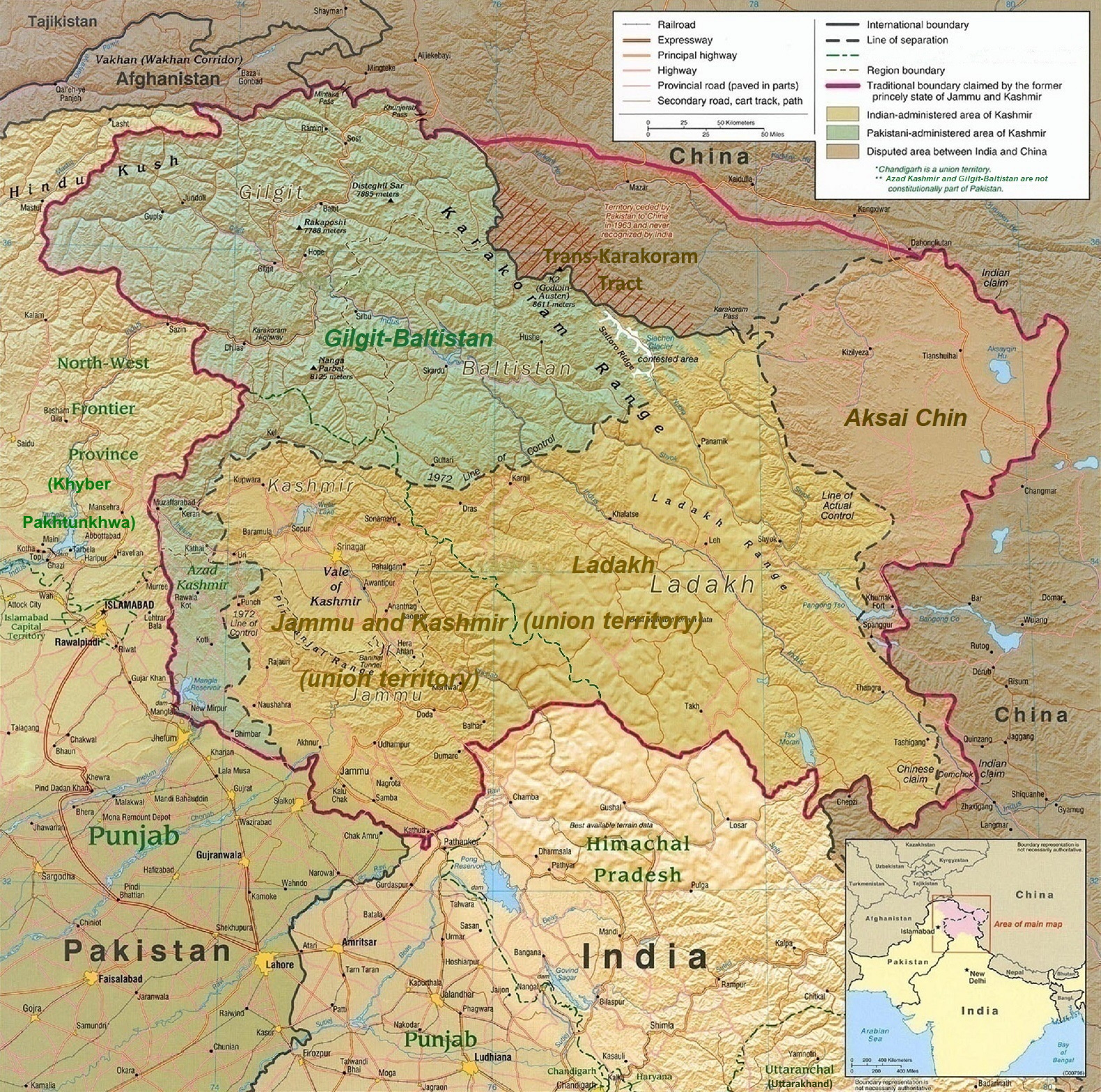
Present-day political map of the Kashmir region, showing Indian-administered territories in yellow, Pakistani-administered territories in green and Chinese-administered territories in red (credit: CIA)

The Ministry of Kashmir Affairs, Gilgit-Baltistan, and States & Frontier Regions (Note: Simplified to the Ministry of Kashmir Affairs, Gilgit Baltistan & SAFRON) (Urdu: وزارت امور کشمیر، گلگت بلتستان و ریاستیں و سرحدی امور, romanized: vizārat-e-umūr kaśmīr, gilgit baltistān va riyāsateṅ va sarḥadī umūr) is a ministry of the Government of Pakistan. It handles the regional affairs of Azad Jammu and Kashmir and Gilgit-Baltistan as both territories of Pakistani-administered Kashmir do not have regular provincial status within Pakistan due to political circumstances revolving around the long-running Kashmir conflict. In 2025 the Ministry of States and Frontier Regions, which handled the tribal and frontier regions of the country was merged into it.

== History ==
=== 1949–1974 ===
The Ministry of Kashmir Affairs (MKA) was first established in January 1949 following the First Indo-Pakistani War, which left Kashmir divided between India and Pakistan through a UNSC-mandated ceasefire line. Mushtaq Ahmad Gurmani, former diwan of Bahawalpur and Pakistani state minister without portfolio (sic) was appointed as the minister in charge of the MKA. A sprawling office was set up in Rawalpindi with a 300-man secretariat. The MKA also had directorates for public relations, refugee rehabilitation, movements and quartering, and civil supplies and coordination, which were located in the city of Murree.

In April 1949, the MKA executed the Azad Kashmir Karachi Agreement with the then President of Azad Kashmir, Muhammad Ibrahim Khan and the head of the All Jammu and Kashmir Muslim Conference, Chaudhry Ghulam Abbas. The document's terms gave complete control over the areas of Gilgit and Baltistan to the MKA. For the territory of Azad Jammu and Kashmir itself, control over defence and foreign affairs was ceded to the ministry, including the responsibilities of contemporary negotiations with the United Nations and any arrangements for the envisaged plebiscite for Kashmir. However, on the ground, the ministry had almost complete control over the Azad Jammu and Kashmir government, due to the latter's few resources and almost full dependence on Pakistan for supplies and management.

Brookings Institution scholar Navnita C. Behera states:

In the chequered evolution of Azad Kashmir’s political status, one constant has been the supremacy of the Ministry of Kashmir Affairs (MKA) set up in 1948. Notwithstanding the changing form of government—basic democracy (1960), presidential form (1971), and parliamentary system (1974)—the ultimate authority has always been vested in the MKA.

Australian political scientist Christopher Snedden states:

The joint secretary heading the MKA 'had the best claim to being the real head of the Azad Kashmir government'.

Kashmiri political analyst Ershad Mahmud states:

There is no denying the fact that, up to 1970, the fate of AJK governments largely depended on the allpowerful bureaucrats of the Ministry of Kashmir Affairs that were the kingmakers.

=== 1974–present ===
In 1974, under the Zulfikar Ali Bhutto administration, Azad Jammu and Kashmir's first constitution was drafted—known as the Interim Constitution of 1974. Under this ruling, Pakistan's controlled territory in Kashmir was politically bifurcated, with the regions comprising Gilgit and Baltistan being split into a separate unit called the Northern Areas. Likewise, the MKA was renamed to the Ministry of Kashmir Affairs and Northern Areas (MKANA).

In 2009, the Northern Areas were formally renamed to Gilgit-Baltistan, and the MKANA was correspondingly renamed to the Ministry of Kashmir Affairs and Gilgit-Baltistan (MoKGB). Europe's foremost think tanks have asserted that the China Pakistan Economic Corridor (CPEC) is infringing upon the human rights of the residents of Gilgit-Baltistan, a contested territory traversed by the highway. Furthermore, the construction of CPEC is inflicting significant ecological harm on the region.

In 2025, the Ministry of States and Frontier Regions was also merged into it.

== Management divisions ==
- Jammu and Kashmir Refugees Rehabilitation Organization
- Northern Areas Transport Corporation
- Directorate of Health Service, AJK
- Directorate of Health Service, Gilgit-Baltistan
- Jammu and Kashmir State Property, Lahore

== See also ==
- Ministry of States and Frontier Regions
- Azad Jammu and Kashmir Council
- Gilgit-Baltistan Council
- Kashmir
- Kashmir conflict

== Bibliography ==
- Behera, Navnita Chadha (2007), Demystifying Kashmir, Pearson Education India, ISBN 978-8131708460
- Snedden, Christopher (2013) [first published as The Untold Story of the People of Azad Kashmir, 2012], Kashmir: The Unwritten History, HarperCollins India, ISBN 978-9350298985
- Snedden, Christopher (2015), Understanding Kashmir and Kashmiris, Oxford University Press, ISBN 978-1-84904-342-7
