= Kashmiris in Punjab =

People of partial or full Kashmiri descent

Regions with significant populations
- 155,088 in Punjab, Pakistan (2023 census, see below), including in Lahore, Sialkot, Rawalpindi, Gujrat, Jhelum, Narowal, Gujranwala, Faisalabad

Languages
- Majority: Punjabi; Minority: Hindi-Urdu, Kashmiri

Religion
- Punjab, Pakistan: Islam; Punjab, India: Hinduism

Related ethnic groups
- Kashmiri diaspora

The Kashmiris in Punjab, also referred to as Punjabi Kashmiris, are a group of people in the Punjab region divided between India and Pakistan, who either have full or partial Kashmiri ancestry.

Kashmiris in Punjab are descendants of those who have historically migrated from the Kashmir Valley in India's Jammu and Kashmir and settled in Punjab.

Most people of this category identify as Punjabis with Kashmiri descent, either some or full. Kashmiri migration from the Kashmir Valley to Punjab continued during Sikh and Dogra rule.

== History ==
=== Pre-independence ===
Heavy commodifications taxation under the Sikh rule caused many Kashmiri peasants to migrate to the plains of the Punjab. These claims, made in Kashmiri histories, were corroborated by European travelers. When one such European traveller, Moorcroft, left the Kashmir Valley in 1823, about 500 emigrants accompanied him across the Pir Panjal Pass. The 1833 famine resulted in many people leaving the Kashmir Valley and migrating to the Punjab, with the majority of weavers leaving Kashmir. Some weavers had already been settling down for generations in the hilly cities of Jammu and Nurpur. The 1833 famine led to a large influx of Kashmiris into Amritsar which was also under Sikh rule. Kashmiri Muslims in particular suffered and had to leave Kashmir in large numbers, while Kashmiri Hindus were not much affected. The emigration during the Sikh rule resulted in Kashmiris enriching the culture and cuisines of Amritsar, Lahore and Rawalpindi. Sikh rule in Kashmir ended in 1846 and was followed by the rule of Dogra Hindu maharajahs who ruled Kashmir as part of their princely state of Jammu and Kashmir.

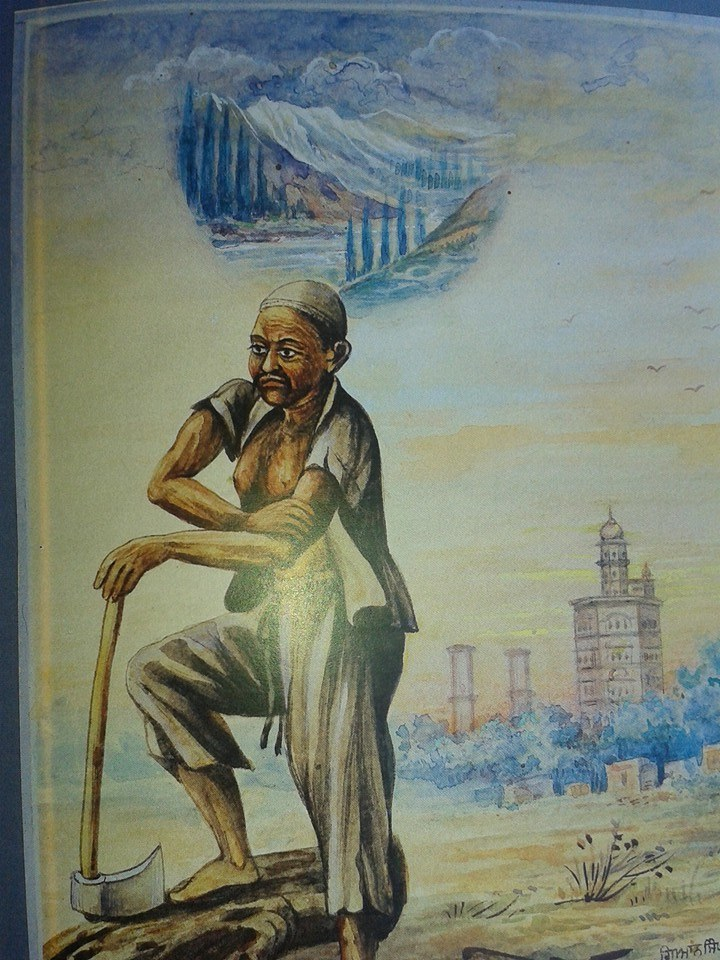
Painting of a Kashmiri migrant labourer (hato) in Amritsar, with Gurdwara Baba Atal in the background, by Gian Singh 'Naqqash'

A large number of Kashmiri Muslims migrated from the Kashmir Valley to the Punjab due to conditions in the princely state such as famine, extreme poverty and harsh treatment of Kashmiri Muslims by the Dogras. According to the 1911 Census there were 177,549 Kashmiri Muslims in the Punjab. With the inclusion of Kashmiri settlements in NWFP this figure rose to 206,180. Writing for the Kashmir Observer, journalist Ali Malik estimates that, due to the migrations over the centuries, around half of the ethnic Kashmiri population had been living in Punjab before the 1947 partition, mostly in cities such as Lahore, Sialkot, Rawalpindi and Amritsar, in Amritsar making up to one sixth of the city's total population but virtually all moving into Pakistan following the partition of India.

Scholar Ayesha Jalal states that Kashmiris faced discrimination in the Punjab as well. Kashmiris settled for generations in the Punjab were unable to own land, including the family of Muhammad Iqbal. Scholar Chitralekha Zutshi states that Kashmiri Muslims settled in the Punjab retained emotional and familial links to Kashmir and felt obliged to struggle for the freedom of their brethren in the Valley.

Common krams (surnames) found amongst the Kashmiri Muslims who migrated from the Valley to the Punjab include Butt, Dar, Lone, Wain (Wani), Mir.

=== Post-independence ===
Kashmiri Muslims constituted an important segment of several Punjabi cities such as Sialkot, Lahore, Amritsar and Ludhiana. Following the partition of India in 1947 and the subsequent communal unrest across Punjab, many Kashmiri Muslims living in East Punjab migrated en masse to West Punjab. Kashmiri migrants from Amritsar have had a big influence on Lahore's contemporary cuisine and culture. The Kashmiris of Amritsar were more steeped in their Kashmiri culture than the Kashmiris of Lahore. Ethnic Kashmiris from Amritsar also migrated in large numbers to Rawalpindi, where Kashmiris had already introduced their culinary traditions during the British Raj.

An exclusive research conducted by the Jang Media Group showed that the Kashmiri community had been involved in spearheading the power politics of Lahore district since 1947. The Kashmiri diaspora in Punjab also influences politics in the Gujranwala, Gujrat and Sialkot districts.

== Demographics ==
=== In Pakistan's Punjab ===
As per the 2017 Pakistani census, ethnic Kashmiris made up 0.17% of Punjab's population, comprising 184,032 people. The 2023 Pakistani census showed them comprising 0.12% of the province's population, comprising 155,088 people.

== Notable Punjabi Kashmiris ==
One of the most prominent Kashmiri was Muhammad Iqbal, whose poetry displayed a keen sense of belonging to Punjab and Kashmir Valley. Another Punjabi-Kashmiri was the famous storywriter Saadat Hasan Manto.

The Sharif family is a notable Punjabi-Kashmiri political family, the members of the family include the former prime minister of Pakistan Nawaz Sharif, the incumbent prime minister Shehbaz Sharif, and the chief minister of Punjab Maryam Nawaz.

Other political figures also include the deputy prime minister of Pakistan Ishaq Dar and defence minister Khawaja Asif.

The following is a list of notable Kashmiris of Punjab:

- Abid Kashmiri, Pakistani TV and stage actor
- Ahmad Ali Butt, Pakistan actor, comedian, musician, rapper, TV host
- Ahmed Butt, Pakistani actor, model, singer
- Avtar Kishan Hangal (1914–2012), Indian actor and freedom fighter
- Ali Azmat, Pakistani singer-songwriter, musician and actor from a Butt family
- Durdana Butt, Pakistani comedian and actress
- Emmad Irfani, Pakistani TV actor
- Farhan Saeed, Pakistani actor and singer from a Butt family
- Hamid Mir, Pakistani journalist, columnist and author
- The Great Gama, (1878–1960, real name Ghulam Mohammad Baksh Butt) record-breaking pehlwani wrestler and feared strongman in British colonial India
- Ghulam Mustafa Tabassum, Pakistani Urdu and Punjabi language poet, prominent scholar of Persian language
- Ilyas Kashmiri, Pakistani film actor
- Imran Khalid Butt, Gujranwala politician
- Ishaq Dar, Pakistani finance minister
- Ismat Beg, Pakistani mathematician and researcher
- Javid Iqbal, Pakistani philosopher and senior justice
- Khalid Abbas Dar, Pakistani TV and stage actor
- Khawaja Saad Rafique, Pakistani politician
- Khurram Dastgir, Pakistani politician and former federal minister from Gujranwala
- Mir Khalil-ur-Rehman, Pakistani newspaper entrepreneur and founder of the Jang Group
- Mohammad Sanaullah Dar or Meeraji (1912–1949), Indian Urdu poet
- Muhammad Aslam Butt, former mayor of Gujranwala, Pakistan
- Muhammad Iqbal (1877–1938), writer, philosopher and politician in British India from a Sapru family of Sopore town in Kashmir, who migrated to Sialkot in Punjab
- Muhammad Taufeeq Butt, Pakistani politician from Gujranwala
- Muhammad Younis Butt, Pakistani screenwriter, humorist, columnist
- Mushaf Ali Mir, Pakistani four-star Air force general and former Chief of Air Staff of the Pakistan Air Force (PAF)
- Muneeb Butt, Pakistani actor based in Karachi
- Nazir Ahmed Butt, former Pakistan Army Lieutenant-General, now Chairman of National Accountability Bureau
- Nida Dar, Pakistani cricketer
- Nooh Dastgir Butt, Pakistani weight lifter, gold medalist Commonwealth Games 2022
- Osman Khalid Butt, Pakistani actor based in Islamabad
- Parmeshwar Narayan Haksar (1913–1998), Indian bureaucrat and diplomat
- Saifuddin Kitchlew (1888–1963), Indian independence activist, barrister and politician
- Salman Butt, Pakistani cricketer
- Salman Taseer, Pakistani politician and businessman, founder of Daily Times
- Samina Peerzada (nee Butt), Pakistani actress
- Sanaullah Amritsari, Pakistani Sunni Islamic scholar
- Shaan Shahid Pakistani Urdu and Punjabi film actor
- Sheikh Rasheed Ahmad, Pakistani politician from Rawalpindi
- Sikandar Raza, Pakistani-born Zimbabwean cricketer
- Sohail Ahmed, Pakistani film, TV and stage actor
- Swarup Rani Nehru (1868–1938), Indian independence activist and mother of Jawaharlal Nehru
- Usman Dar, leader of Pakistan Tehreek-e-Insaf from Sialkot

== See also ==
- Kashmiri diaspora
- Pathans of Punjab
- Baloch of Punjab
- Kashmiris in Azad Kashmir
