= Thehrian =

Thehrian is a village in Muzaffarabad District, Kashmir. It is twenty five kilometers far from Muzaffarabad, the capital of Azad Kashmir. There is one high school for girls and boys. The village's main crops are wheat and maize.
