= Dhal Qazian Bagh =

Town in Azad Kashmir, Pakistan

Dhal Qazian is a town near Bagh, in Azad Kashmir, Pakistan. It is located approximately 6 km from Bagh at an altitude of 1700 m. Dhal Qazian is divided into Upper and Lower Dhal. The town is led by a union council.
