= Chikar (town) =

Tehsil headquarters in Azad Kashmir, Pakistan

Chikar چکار
- Town
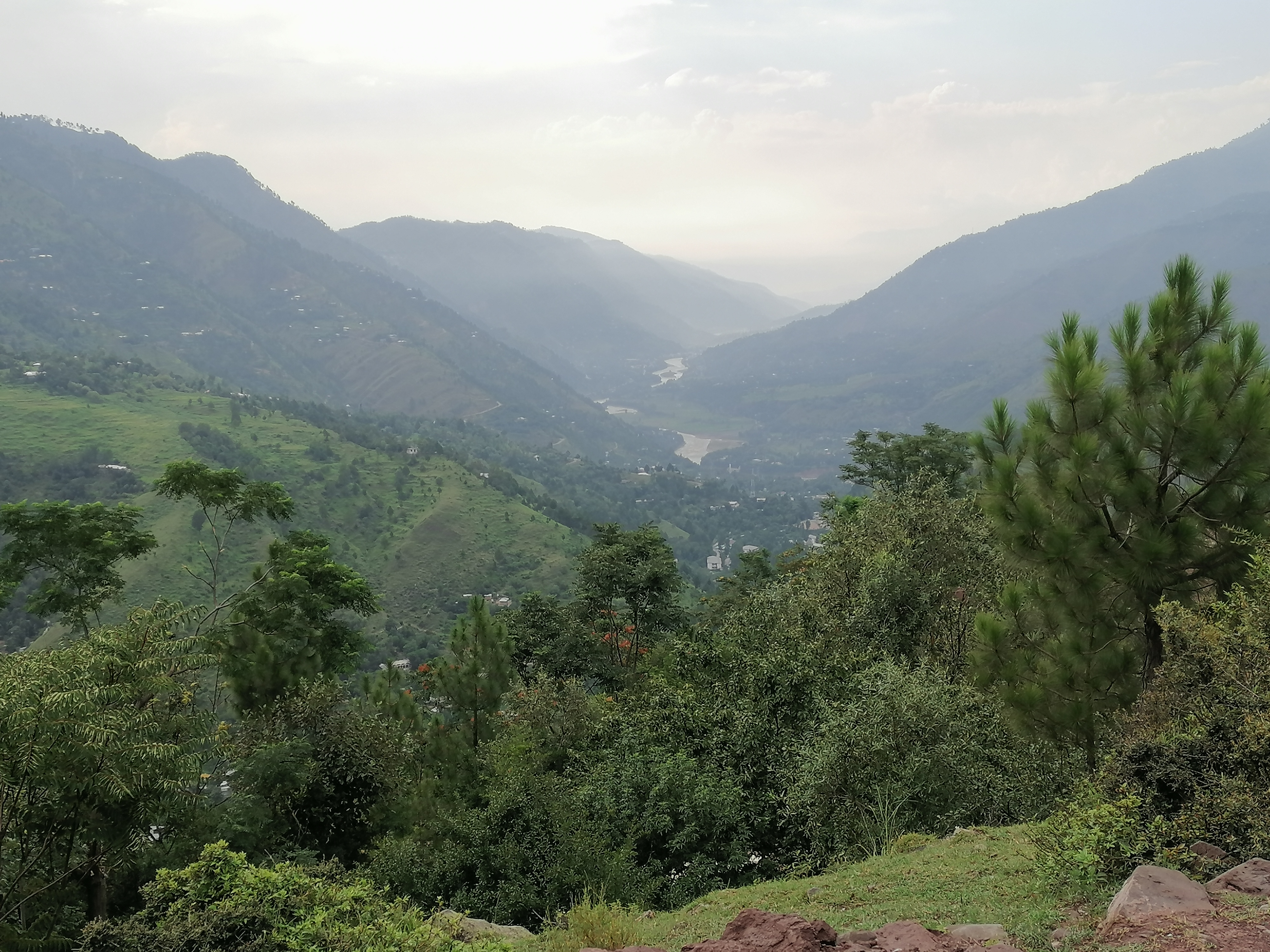
- View of Chikar valley

- Location in Azad Kashmir
- Coordinates: 34.14783°N 73.68284°E
- Country: Pakistan
- Territory: Azad Kashmir
- District: Hattian Bala District
- Time zone: UTC+5 (PST)
- Postal code: 13170

Chikar (Urdu: چکار) is a hill town and the headquarters of Chikar Tehsil in Hattian Bala District, Azad Kashmir, Pakistan. The town lies in the Jhelum Valley region and serves as an administrative and transit hub for routes leading toward Sudhan Gali and Leepa Valley.

== Administration ==
Chikar functions as one of the three tehsils in Hattian Bala District, along with Hattian Bala and Leepa. The AJK High Court lists a Tehsil Qazi court in Chikar, confirming its judicial and administrative role. Environmental and planning documents from the Government of Azad Jammu and Kashmir also enumerate these tehsils in the district’s official structure.

== Geography and access ==
Chikar lies on a branch road diverging from the Muzaffarabad–Chakothi highway and ascending through the Himalayan foothills. The route connects Chikar with nearby settlements such as Loonbagla and the upland valleys of Sudhan Gali and Leepa. Its location makes it a convenient stopover and service town for the surrounding mountain communities. District-level transport, tourism, and socio-economic data are compiled annually in the Azad Jammu & Kashmir Statistical Year Book published by the Planning & Development Department.

== 2005 earthquake and Zalzal Lake ==
The 2005 Kashmir earthquake (moment magnitude 7.6) triggered extensive landsliding across Azad Kashmir, particularly in the Muzaffarabad–Hattian Bala region. Near Hattian Bala, a massive rock avalanche dammed local streams and produced several landslide-impounded lakes documented by the United States Geological Survey (USGS) and later studies.

Local media also refer to a nearby Zalzal (Earthquake) Lake, a landslide-dammed lake popular with visitors; reports place it about 55 kilometres from Muzaffarabad on the Chikar route.

== Language and culture ==
District-level statistics show that Pahari (Punjabiic), Gojri, and Kashmiri are the main local languages spoken in Hattian Bala District, while Urdu serves as the official and inter-district lingua franca.

Historical and archaeological studies indicate the wider Muzaffarabad Division once contained Hindu and Sikh temples and shrines prior to Partition, reflecting the region’s multi-religious past.

== See also ==
- Jhelum Valley District
- Hattian Bala
- Leepa Valley
- 2005 Kashmir earthquake
