= Panyali =

Panyali is a village situated in the union council of Banni Passari, Punjab, Pakistan, 9 kilometres away from the city of Bagh.
