= Kayian =

Kayian Awan Patti کائیاں
- Village
- Location within Pakistan
- Coordinates: 34.13°N 73.37°E
- Country: Pakistan
- Autonomous territory: Azad Kashmir
- District: Muzaffarabad

Population (2015 Estimated)
  - Total: 600

Languages
  - Official: Urdu
  - Native: Hindko
- Time zone: PST

Kayian Awan Patti Urdu: کائیاں is a small village situated in Awan Patti valley, Muzaffarabad District, Azad Kashmir.
