= Kobra Peak =

Mountain in Kashmir

Coordinates: 34°0′59″N 73°52′14″E

Kobra Peak is near Bagh, Azad Kashmir, Pakistan. Its altitude is 9,932 feet (3,027 m).
