= Ganga Choti =

Peak in Azad Jammu Kashmir

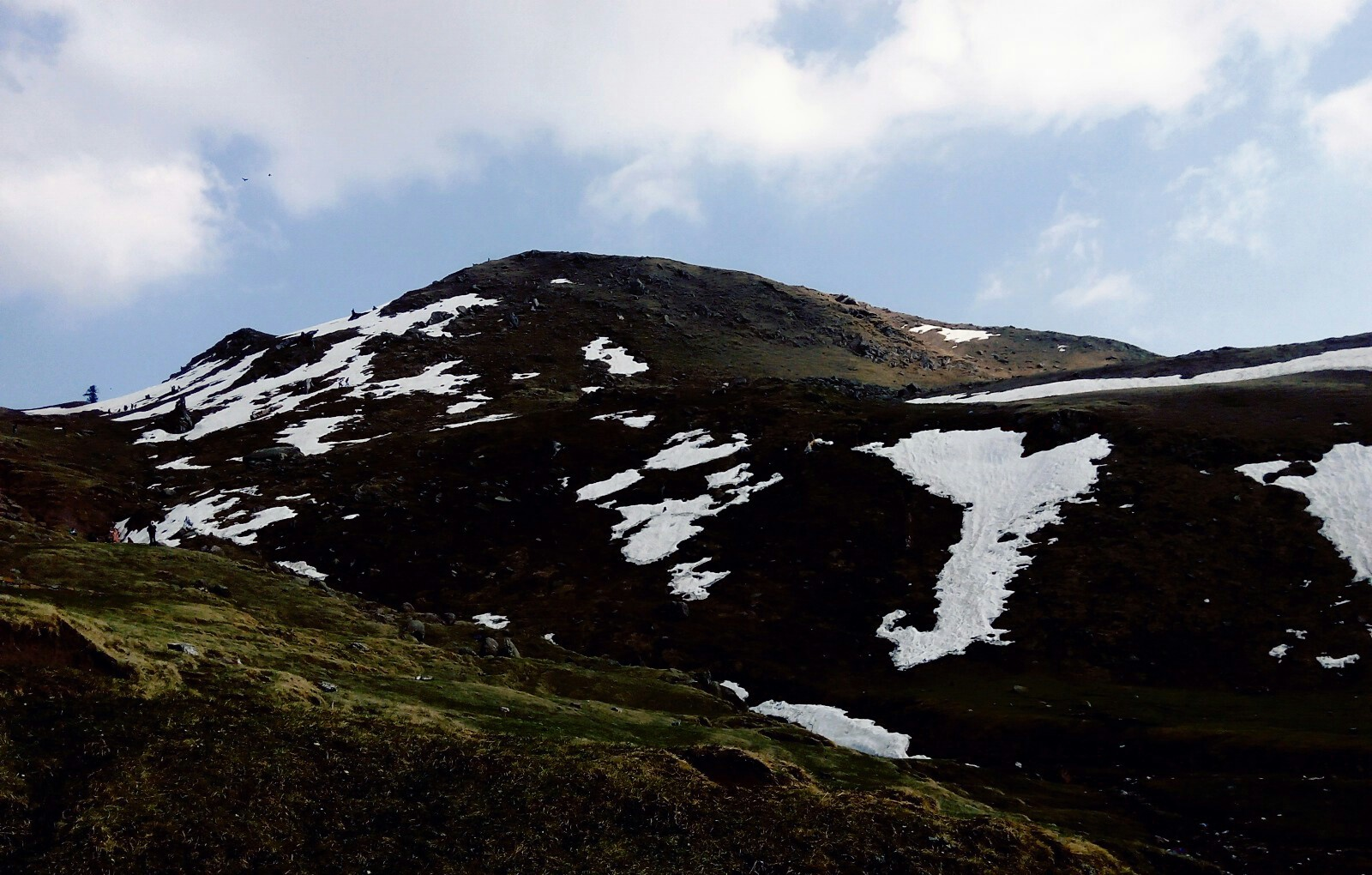
- Ganga Choti in Bagh District

Highest point
- Elevation: 3,045 m (9,990 ft)
- Listing: Mountains of Pakistan
- Coordinates: 34°04′30″N 73°47′20″E

Geography
- Location within Kashmir Location within Pakistan
- Location: Bagh District, Kashmir, Pakistan
- Parent range: Pir Panjal Range

Ganga Choti (Urdu: گنگا چوٹی) is a peak located in Bagh District of Azad Kashmir, Pakistan. Located at a height of 3,045 metres (9,990 ft), it is a part of the Pir Panjal Range of the Lower Himalayas. Geographically, it is located between the union council Birpani and Sudhan Gali town in the village of Bani Minhasan.

== Local Area ==
Ganga Choti is a peak in the village & Tehsil Birpani in the Bagh District. Just a few kilometers north of this village is the Hattian Bala district. Before the partition of Kashmir. Ganga Choti peak was on the border of the Kashmir and Jammu districts.

== Etymology ==
It is said by the locals that the peak got its name from the local Hindus who resided in the region before the Partition of India.

== Access ==
There are two ways to reach Ganga Choti, one from Chikkar, and the other from Bagh Sudhan Gali Road. Sudhan Gali is a small town located about four kilometers from Ganga Choti, and has a few shops and hotels, which can be used by travelers. From there, it is an eight-kilometer uphill hike to reach the summit. Off-road vehicles can also be used to shorten the journey.

== Winter sports ==
In recent years, the AJK Winter Sports Association has been organizing winter sports activities in a bid to promote tourism and generate economic activity in the area.

== See also ==
- Bagh District
