= Pīr Kanthi =

Pir Kanthi
- Location within Pakistan

Highest point
- Elevation: 4,264 m (13,990 ft)
- Coordinates: 34°18′58″N 73°54′22″E

Geography
- Location: Bagh District, Azad Kashmir, Pakistan
- Parent range: Pir Panjal

Pīr Kanthi is located in Bagh District, Azad Kashmir, in the mountains of the Pir Panjal Range. It is estimated to be 4,264 metres (2.650 mi; 13,990 ft) above sea level.

It is about 200 kilometres (120 mi) northeast of Islamabad. At Sudhan Gali, visitors who arrive by car can park and walk to the top of the path that leads to Shar Comp. Although mountaineering is fairly easy hike to the peak, climbers have been killed in storms. At this peak, hikers can see views of the Himalayan mountains. The water comes from the mountain Jhelum River.
