= Birpani =

Town in Azad Kashmir, Pakistan

Coordinates: 34°2′50″N 73°45′22″E

Tehsil Birpani (Urdu: بیرپانی) is a town and Union Council in Bagh District, Azad Kashmir, Pakistan. There is a food depot in the settlement.

Birpani is 69 kilometres (43 mi) by road from Kohala and 148 kilometres (92 mi) from Islamabad. The peak of Ganga Choti is a nearby tourist spot.
