= Leepa =

Village in Azad Kashmir, Pakistan

- Village
- Location within Azad Kashmir Location within Pakistan
- Coordinates: 34.3034°N 73.8878°E
- Country: Pakistan
- State: Kashmir
- District: Hattian Bala
- Elevation: 1,921 m (6,302 ft)

Languages
  - Official: Urdu
  - Local: Kashmiri
- Time zone: PST

Leepa (Urdu: لیپہ) is a village in Leepa Valley, Hattian Bala District of the Pakistani-administered Kashmir. It is located 105 kilometres (65 mi) from Muzaffarabad at the altitude of 1,921 metres (6,302 ft).

The village is accessible from Muzaffarabad by Muzaffarabad-Chakothi road branches off at Naile which leads to Reshian. From Reshian the remaining 23 kilometres (14 mi) can be covered only by jeep.
