= Chinari, Azad Kashmir =

Chinari چناری
- Market/City
- Location within Pakistan
- Coordinates: 34.1594°N 73.8263°E
- Country: Pakistan
- State: Azad Kashmir
- District: Jhelum Valley

Languages
  - Official: Urdu
- Time zone: PST

Chinari (Urdu: چناری) is a city and hill station in Jhelum Valley District, Azad Kashmir, Pakistan. It is located 49 kilometers (30 mi) from Muzaffarabad on the bank of the Jhelum River.

The city is accessible from Muzaffarabad by Muzaffarabad-Chakothi road. Some private hotels and a rest house with basic facilities are located here for tourists stay.
