= Garhi Dupatta =

Garhi Dupatta گڑھی دوپٹہ
- Tehsil
- Location within Pakistan
- Coordinates: 34.2256°N 73.6154°E
- Country: Pakistan
- State: Azad Kashmir
- District: Muzaffarabad

Population (2017)
  - Total: 7,931

Languages
  - Official: Hindko, Urdu
- Time zone: PST

Garhi Dupatta (also spelled Garhi Dopatta) (Urdu: گڑھی دوپٹہ) is a small town. It is located 20 kilometers (12 mi) away from Muzaffarabad city on Muzaffarabad-Chakothi road along with Jhelum River.
