= Leepa Valley =

Valley in Azad Kashmir, Pakistan

Leepa Valley وادی لیپہ
- Valley
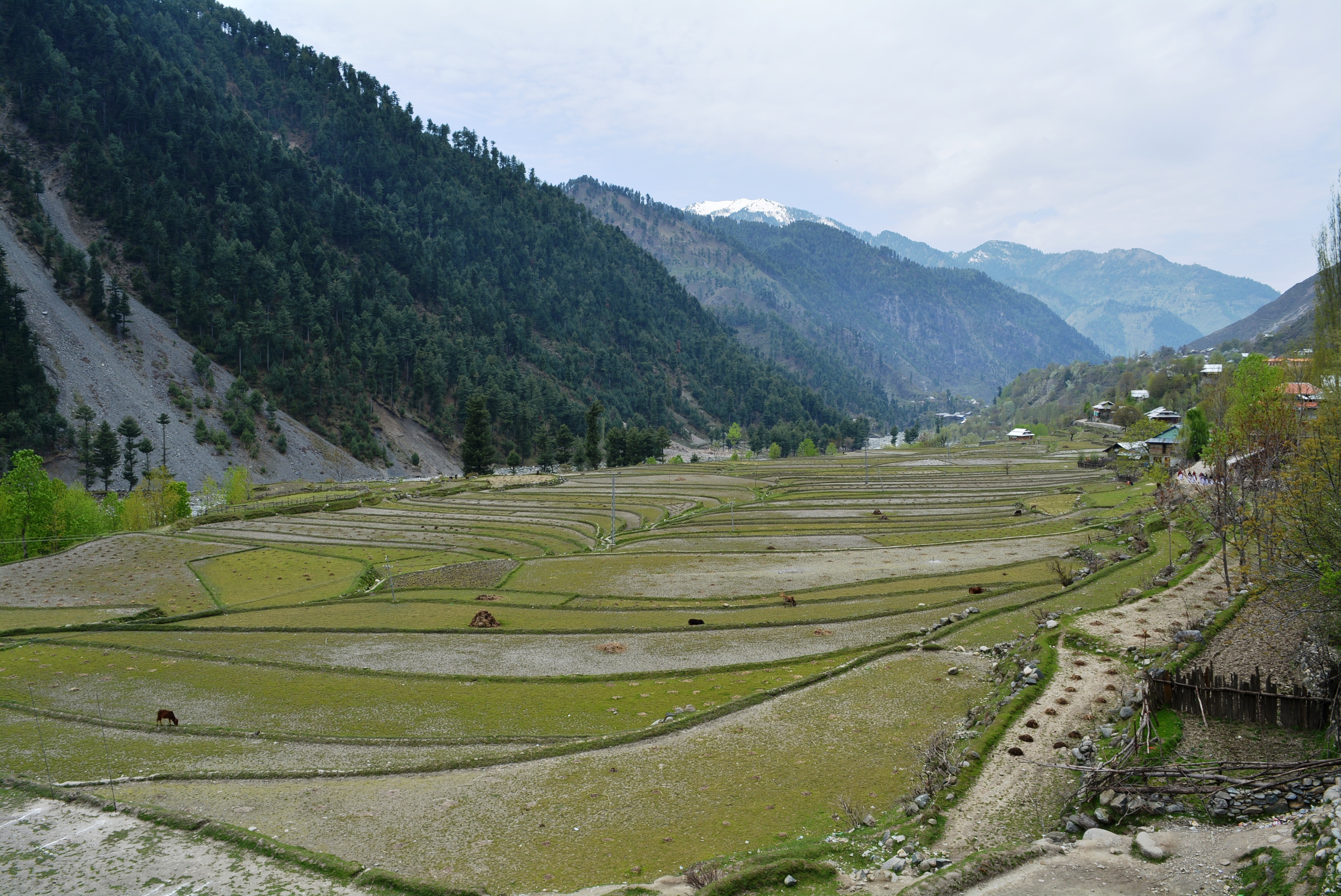
- Paddy fields in Leepa c. 2016

- Location within Azad Kashmir Location within Pakistan
- Coordinates: 34.3136°N 73.8981°E
- Country: Pakistan
- Adm. Unit: Azad Kashmir
- District: Hattian Bala

Languages
  - Official: Urdu
  - Local: Kashmiri, Pahari-Potwari, Hindko, Gojri
- Time zone: UTC+05:00 (PKT)

The Leepa Valley (Urdu: وادی لیپہ) is an arable valley situated in the Hattian Bala District of Azad Kashmir administered by Pakistan. It is located approximately 83 kilometres (52 mi) from Muzaffarabad, the capital city of Azad Kashmir. The valley features small hamlets and is divided into five sectors; Nowkot, Kasirkot, Dao Khan, Leepa, and Chananian.

== History ==
Leepa Valley was formerly part of Karnah tehsil of Kupwara district in Jammu and Kashmir. The valley is now part of Jhelum Valley District in Azad Kashmir, Pakistan. It has been an area of strife among the two neighboring countries.

== Geography ==
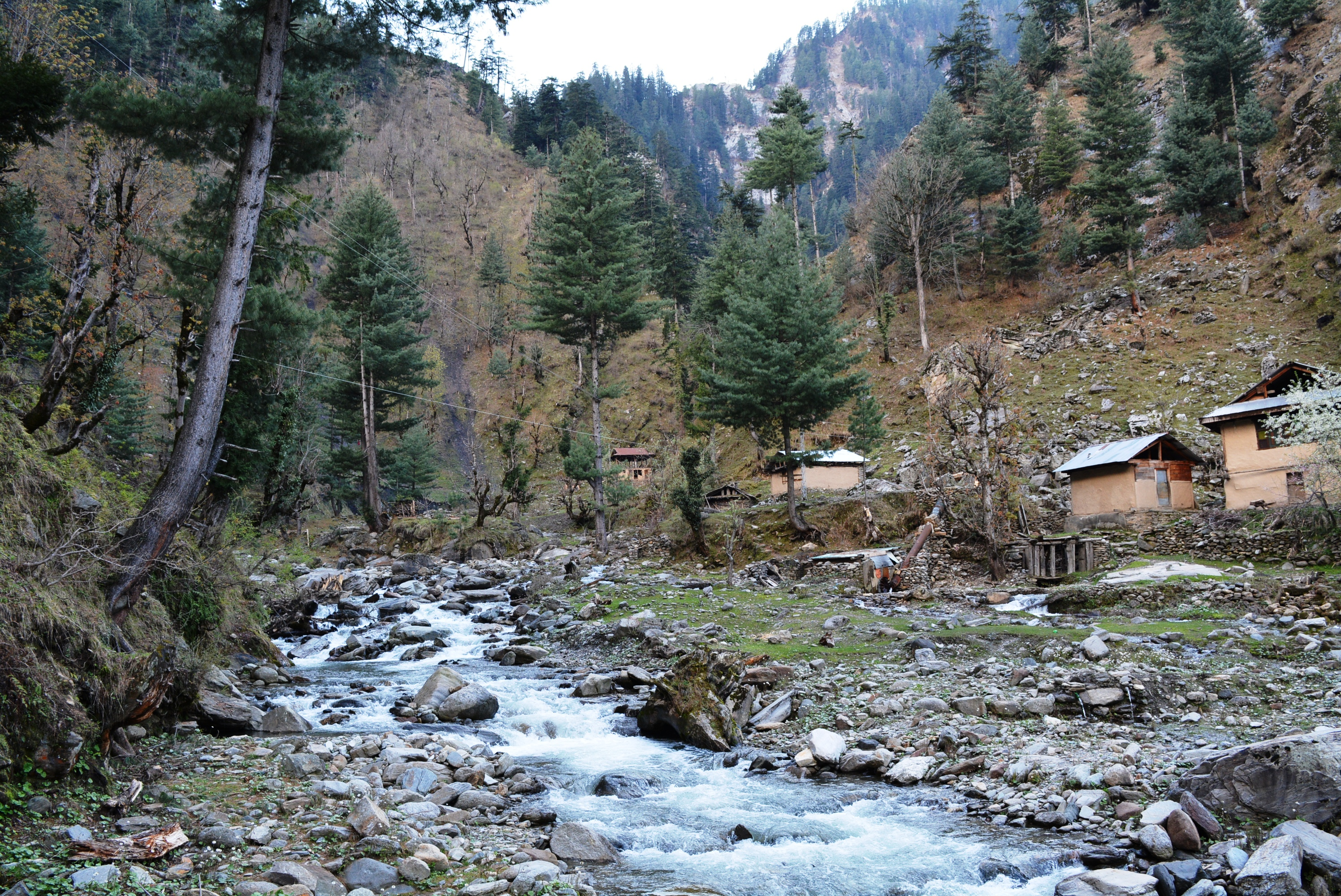
A stream in the Moji village of the valley

Leepa Valley is situated 10,000 feet (3,000 m) above sea level. Snowfall occurs regularly throughout the year.

Rice fields and apple orchids can be found frequently in the whole valley. The Line of Control, which separates Azad Kashmir from Jammu and Kashmir, can be seen from most places in the valley from east to west.

== Demographics ==
The population of Leepa Valley is about 50,000. The main language which is spoken in the valley is Kashmiri, followed by Pahari-Pothwari and Gojari.

There is Dargah of Peer Sakhi Shahin Tootmar Khan Gali. It is near Treda Sharif in Moji hamlet near Leepa Valley.

== See also ==
- Bhimber Gali
- Haji Pir Pass
- Tourism in Azad Kashmir
