= Kharal Abbasian =

Village in Bagh District, Pakistan

Kharal Abbasian is a village north-east of Bagh District headquarters in Pakistan

The village is located in the Bagh District of Azad Jammu and Kashmir, Pakistan. It is named after the Abbasi families who have historically resided there in large numbers. Prominent clan of this area are Abbassi, whereas, besides abbasies some families of Awan, Mir and Gujjar are also residing here. Prominent Places : Darbar-e-Aliya Dhar Sharif Bagh AJK is the Holy shrine of Saen Qibla Nawab G Hazuri Rehmatullah alaia where scores of devotees come and pay tribute to saen Nawab shb ...

== Geography and Natural Beauty ==
Kharal Abbasian is situated in a hilly area, known for its scenic beauty. The surrounding hills feature several notable locations, including Shekali, Bara, Choo, and Peer Kanthi.[citation needed] The village is considered a natural landmark in the region due to its landscapes.

== Culture and Social Life ==
The residents of Kharal Abbasian are known for their hospitality and close-knit community.[citation needed] People often support each other during times of hardship and value humanitarian principles.[citation needed] Traditional food practices are observed, including a preference for meat in local cuisine.[citation needed]

== Geography ==
- Coordinates: 33° 59' 13" N, 73° 50' 35" E (33.98706, 73.84323)
- Altitude: The surrounding terrain, particularly the nearby Peer Kanthi peak, reaches an elevation of approximately 4,264 metres above sea level.
- Climate: Kharl Abbasian has a humid subtropical climate characterized by hot summers, cool winters, and seasonal rainfall.

The village is surrounded by lush forests and valleys, with nearby localities including Gali, Chhatrora, Dhar, Shareef, and Hansala.

== Culture ==
Kharl Abbasian's cultural heritage reflects the broader traditions of Azad Kashmir. One of the most prominent cultural practices in the village is "Gatka" (a traditional martial art involving sword and stick fighting), often performed during festivals and local gatherings.

== Cuisine ==
A popular local dish in Kharl Abbasian is Mothi Chawal, which consists of white beans (moth) served with rice. This simple dish is a local favorite and is often served during family meals and social events.

== Politics ==
Politically, the village has representation from major parties including Pakistan Tehreek-e-Insaf (PTI), Pakistan Muslim League (Nawaz) - PML-N, Muslim Conference MC Sardar Atiq Ahmed Khan and independent candidates. A former political figure from Kharl Abbasian, Sardar Khalil Abbasi, was a prominent leader known for his efforts in improving infrastructure, education, and the overall well-being of the community.

== Tourism and wildlife ==
Local tourist attractions include Peer Kanthi, Shekhali, Bara, and Dar Shareef. These locations attract both local and international visitors for their scenery, peaceful atmosphere, and spiritual significance.

The area is also home to diverse wildlife. Hunting (locally called "Shikar") is a common activity, especially targeting wild animals in the surrounding forests and mountains. Due to the presence of wildlife, it is customary for many villagers to own shotguns as a means of protection and self-defense against wild animals.
