= Sudhan Gali =

Sudhan Galli (Dera Sadozai) (ڈیرہ سدوزئی) سدھن گلی
- Village
- Sudhan Galli
- Location within Azad Kashmir
- Coordinates: 34.0757°N 73.7446°E
- Country: Pakistan
- State: Azad Kashmir
- District: Bagh
- Elevation: 2,100 m (7,000 ft)

Languages
  - Official: Urdu
- Time zone: PST

Sudhan Galli (سدھن گلی) also called Dera Sadozai), meaning the "Street of Sudhans", Sudhan Street) is a village located in Bagh District, Azad Kashmir. It lies on the main road that connects the district Bagh to Muzaffarabad, the capital of Azad Kashmir and also connects the tehsil Chikkar with Bagh city.

== 2005 earthquake ==
Ganga Chotti (a mountain peak near Sudhan Gali) was badly affected by the 2005 Pakistan earthquake. In December 2005 the United Nations Children's Fund arrived to deliver clothing before the snows of winter arrived. UNICEF focused their relief efforts on places at high altitudes like Sudhan Gali (which has an altitude of 2,134 metres).

According to UNICEF:

People have lost warm clothing, housing, food and utensils, and that could have affected children – who are the most vulnerable. That’s why UNICEF decided to distribute [kits] at the high altitudes. Last year there was about 12 feet of snow in this area.
