= Muhammad Taufeeq Butt =

Pakistani politician

Member of the Provincial Assembly of the Punjab
- In office 15 August 2018 – 14 January 2023
- Constituency: PP-56 Gujranwala-VI
- In office 29 May 2013 – 31 May 2018
- Constituency: PP-96 (Gujranwala-VI)

Personal details
- Born: 14 November 1969 (age 56) Gujranwala, Punjab, Pakistan
- Party: PMLN (2025-present)
- Other political affiliations: PMLN (2013-2025)

Muhammad Taufeeq Butt is a Pakistani politician who had been a Member of the Provincial Assembly of the Punjab from August 2018 till January 2023. Previously, he was a Member of the Provincial Assembly of the Punjab, from May 2013 to May 2018.

== Early life and education ==
He was born on 14 November 1969 in Gujranwala.

He received intermediate level education.

== Political career ==
He was elected to the Provincial Assembly of the Punjab as a candidate of Pakistan Muslim League (Nawaz) (PML-N) from Constituency PP-96 (Gujranwala-VI) in the 2013 Pakistani general election.

He was re-elected to Provincial Assembly of the Punjab as a candidate of PML-N from Constituency PP-56 (Gujranwala-VI) in the 2018 Pakistani general election.
