= Panjal Mastan National Park =

National park in Azad Kashmir

Panjal Mastan
- National park
- Interactive map of Panjal Mastan
- Coordinates: 34.0574°N 73.7381°E
- Country: Pakistan
- State: Azad Kashmir
- District: Bagh
- Elevation: 2,800 m (9,200 ft)

Languages
  - Official: Urdu
- Time zone: PST

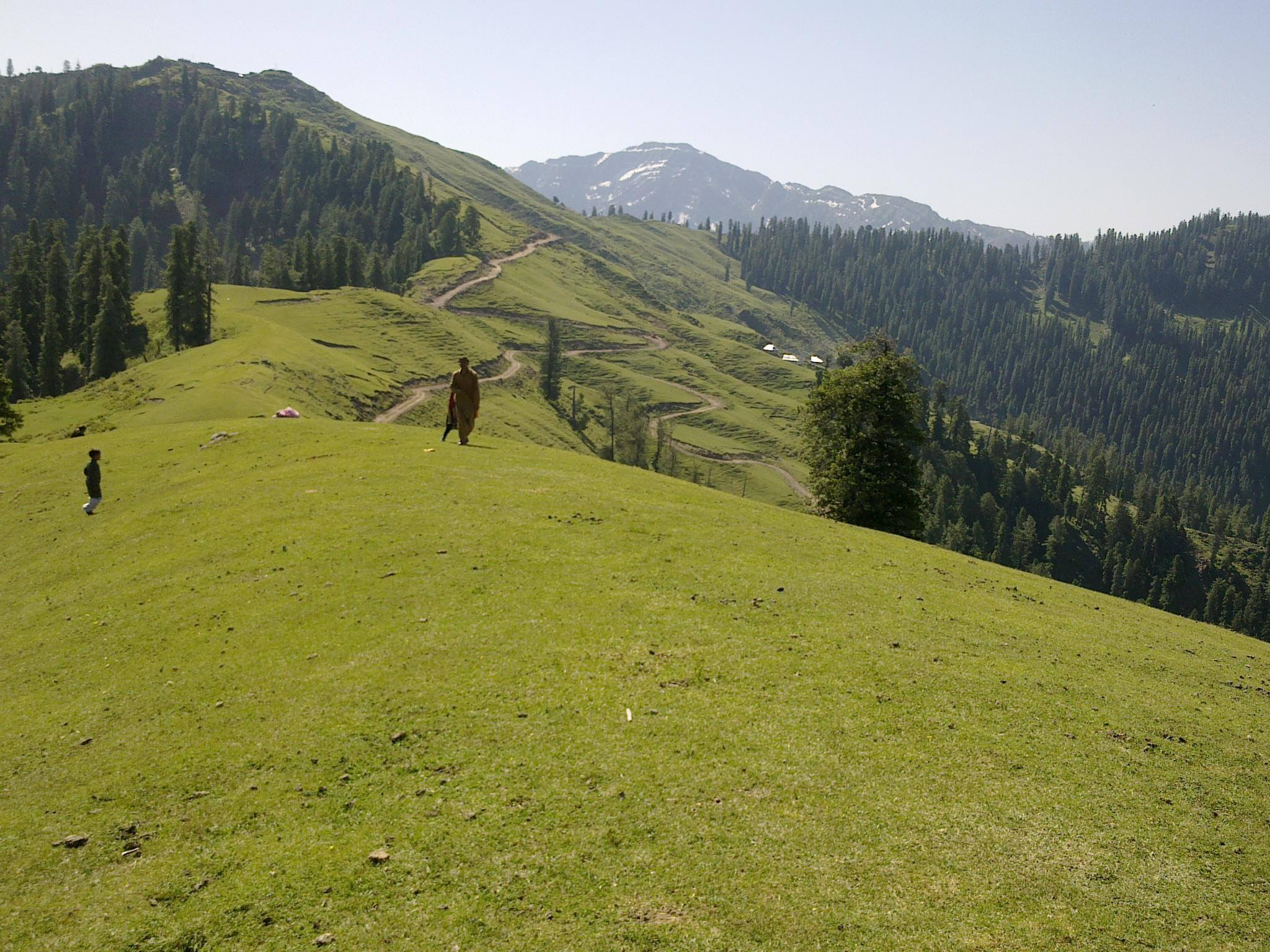
Panjal Mastan National Park Plains

Panjal Mastan (Urdu پنجال مستان) is a picturesque location in the Bagh Valley of Azad Kashmir. The Panjal Mastan National Park, located in the Bagh District, sits at an average elevation of 2,800 metres (9,200 ft) above sea level, making it one of the highest plateaus in the region. Covering an area of 300 square kilometres, the park is renowned for its diverse flora and fauna, part of the Pir Panjal ecoregion. During spring, the plains are adorned with wildflowers, adding to the park's scenic charm.

== Climate and ecology ==
Panjal Mastan has a subtropical highland climate (Cwb) according to the Köppen climate classification. Located in the western part of the outer Pir Panjal range, its high altitude results in cold, snowy winters and relatively cool summers with significantly more rainfall compared to lower elevations. The area frequently experiences fog and receives precipitation year-round, with peaks in winter and summer (July–August). The average annual precipitation is 1,789 mm (70.4 in). Panjal Mastan is home to a variety of rare species, including leopards from the nearby Galiyat region. Common wildlife includes Rhesus macaque, Wild boar, fox, and numerous bird species, such as the cheer pheasant and kalij pheasant. The area is also known for the Panjal vole, a rodent species endemic to Pakistan.
