= Reshian =

Reshian ریشیاں
- Village
- Location within Pakistan
- Coordinates: 34.2577°N 73.8198°E
- Country: Pakistan
- State: Azad Kashmir
- District: Hattian Bala
- Elevation: 1,674 m (5,492 ft)

Languages
  - Official: Urdu
- Time zone: PST

Reshian (Urdu: ریشیاں) is a village in Hattian Bala District of Azad Kashmir, Pakistan. It is located 67 kilometers (42 mi) from Muzaffarabad at the altitude of 1,674 meters (5,492 ft).

Reshian Gali or Reshian Pass is located 8 kilometers (5.0 mi) ahead from here at the altitude of 3,200 meters (10,500 ft).

Reshian is the gateway to Leepa Valley. The village accessible from Muzaffarabad by Muzaffarabad-Chakothi road branches off at Naile. Buses run daily between Muzaffarabad and Reshian.
