= Athmuqam Tehsil =

Tehsil in Azad Kashmir, Pakistan

Athmuqam آٹھمقام
- Tehsil
- Houses on the mountainside in Athmuqam, 2017

- Location within Azad Kashmir Location within Pakistan
- Coordinates: 34°35′21″N 73°54′38″E
- Administering country: Pakistan
- Territory: Azad Kashmir
- Division: Muzaffarabad
- District: Neelum

Area
  - Total: 1,292 km^{2} (499 sq mi)
- Elevation: 1,350 m (4,430 ft)

Population (2017)
  - Total: 129,215
  - Density: 100.0/km^{2} (259.0/sq mi)
- Time zone: UTC+5 (PKT)

Athmuqam (Urdu: آٹھمقام) is a tehsil and the district headquarters of Neelum District in Azad Kashmir, a part of Kashmir administered by Pakistan. It is connected to the regional capital Muzaffarabad by a 80-kilometre road. Its population in 2017 was 129,215.

The University of Azad Jammu & Kashmir, Neelum campus is located in Athmuqam.

== History ==
On 21 October 2019, Pakistani authorities accused the Indian Army of shelling civilians in several parts of Azad Kashmir, including Athmuqam.

A resident of Athmuqam, Raja Ehsan, was killed by Pakistani security forces on 3 August 2026, amid anti-government protests.

== Geography and roads ==
A road in Athmuqam

Athmuqam covers an area measuring 1,292 square kilometres and is situated within the Neelum Valley at an altitude of 1,350 metres. It is located 213 kilometres from the national capital Islamabad by road and is connected to the regional capital Muzaffarabad by an approximately 80-kilometre road. A suspension bridge connects Athmuqam to trails leading to the mountains.

== Administration ==
Athmuqam is a tehsil – a subdistrict – of Neelum District in Azad Kashmir, a part of Kashmir administered by Pakistan. It is also Neelum's district headquarters (capital).

== Demographics ==
The 2017 Pakistani census recorded a population of 129,215 in Athmuqam.

== Economy ==
Like most settlements in the Neelum Valley, tourism makes up a significant part of Athmuqam's economy.

== Services ==
There are government offices, guest houses, schools, and a hospital in Athmuqam.

=== Education ===
The Neelum campus of the University of Azad Jammu & Kashmir is located in Athmuqam. The tehsil also has a number of public elementary and secondary schools, as well as a men's college.
