= Hattian Bala Tehsil =

Tehsil in Azad Kashmir, Pakistan

Hattian Bala ہٹیاں بالا Hattian
- Tehsil
- Location within Azad Kashmir Location within Pakistan
- Coordinates: 34°10′9″N 73°44′36″E
- Administering country: Pakistan
- Territory: Azad Kashmir
- Division: Muzaffarabad
- District: Hattian Bala

Area
  - Total: 530 km^{2} (200 sq mi)

Population (2017)
  - Total: 161,424
  - Density: 300/km^{2} (790/sq mi)
- Time zone: UTC+5 (PKT)

Hattian Bala (Urdu: ہٹیاں بالا), or just Hattian (Urdu: ہٹیاں), is a tehsil and the district headquarters of Hattian Bala District in Azad Kashmir, a part of Kashmir administered by Pakistan. As of the 2017 Pakistani census, the population of Hattian Bala was 161,424.

The largest landslide caused by the 2005 Kashmir earthquake occurred in Hattian Bala; a village was destroyed and around 1,000 people were killed.

== History ==
An earthquake in Kashmir on 8 October 2005 triggered a landslide in Hattian Bala that split a lake in two, destroyed a village, and killed around 1,000 people. It was the largest landslide caused by the earthquake at a volume of 68 million cubic metres, a length of 2.6 kilometres, and a thickness of 63 metres. The dam created by the debris from the landslide gave way on 9 February 2010, releasing 36 million cubic metres of water.

== Geography ==
Hattian Bala is located within the Jhelum Valley and on the banks of the Jhelum River, 40 kilometres from the regional capital Muzaffarabad. It covers an area of 530 square kilometres.

== Administration ==
Hattian Bala is a tehsil (subdistrict) and the district headquarters (capital) of Hattian Bala District in Azad Kashmir, a part of Kashmir administered by Pakistan. Hattian Bala was part of Baramulla district before the India–Pakistan war of 1947–1948, and thereafter transferred to Muzaffarabad District. The Pakistani government created Hattian Bala District in July 2009.

There are 110 villages under the jurisdiction of Hattian Bala.

== Demographics ==
The 2017 Pakistani census recorded 161,424 people living in 26,747 households in Hattian Bala.
