= Muzaffarabad Division =

Administrative division of Azad Kashmir, Pakistan

Muzaffarabad Division مظفرآباد ڈویژن
- Division of Azad Kashmir administered by Pakistan
- Interactive map of Muzaffarabad division
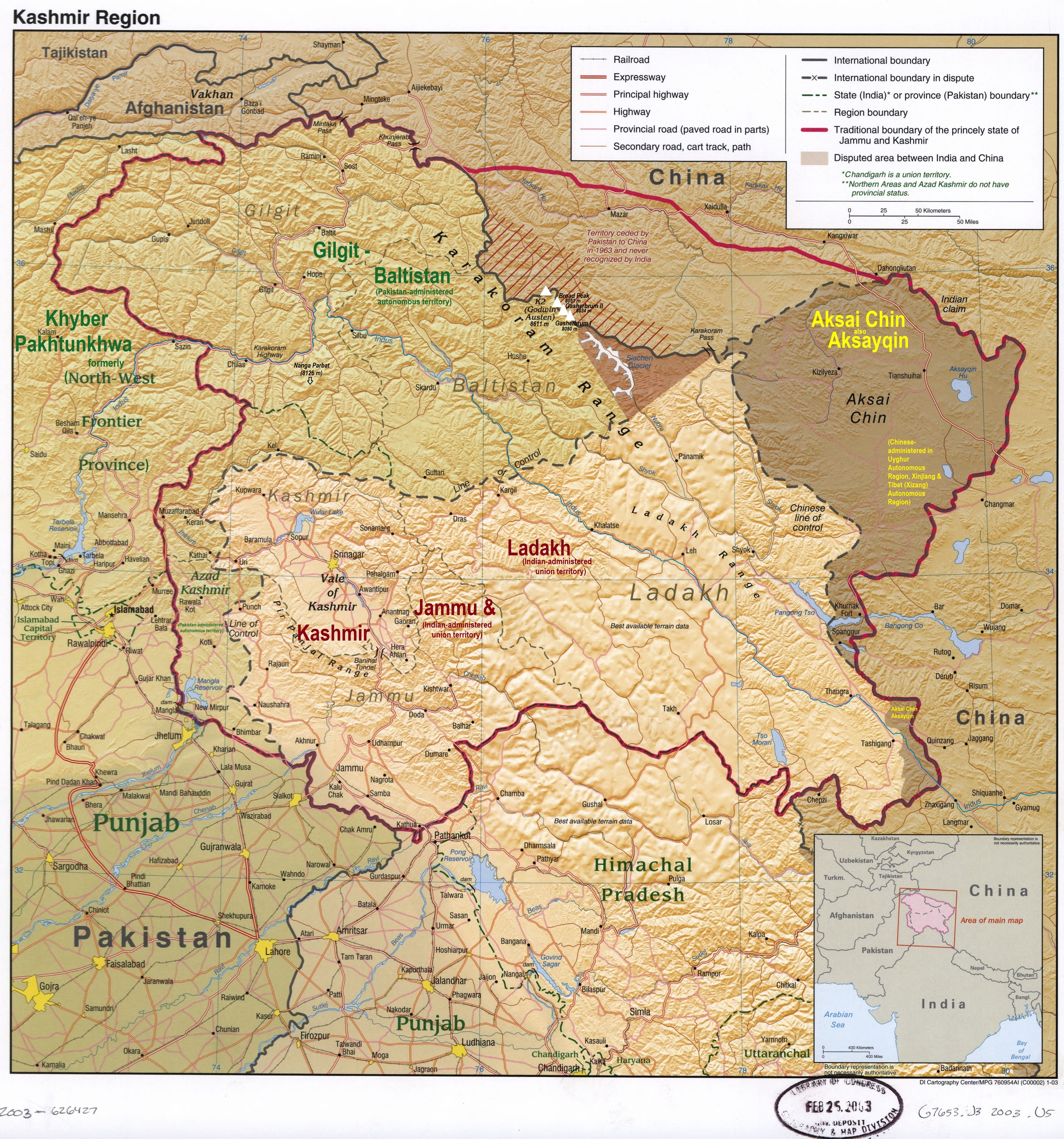
- A map showing Pakistani-administered Azad Kashmir (shaded in sage green) in the disputed Kashmir region
- Coordinates (Muzaffarabad): 34°34′N 73°48′E
- Administering country: Pakistan
- Territory: Azad Kashmir
- Capital: Muzaffarabad

Government
  - Type: Divisional Administration
  - Commissioner: Adnan Khurshid BPS-20(PAS)
  - Regional Police Officer: Irfan Masood Kashfi BPS-20(PSP)

Population (2017)
  - Total: 1,072,150

The Muzaffarabad Division (Urdu: مُظفّر آباد ڈِوِژن) is a first-order administrative division of the Pakistani–administered territory of Azad Kashmir in the disputed Kashmir. (Note: The application of the term "administered" to the various regions of Kashmir and a mention of the Kashmir dispute is supported by multiple sources. Although "controlled" and "held" are also applied neutrally to the names of the disputants or to the regions administered by them, "held" is also considered politicized usage, as is the term "occupied".) It comprises the portion of the former Muzaffarabad District of the princely state of Jammu and Kashmir that came under Pakistani control at the end of the Indo-Pakistani War of 1947. Areas wise it is a largest division of Azad Kashmir compared to Mirpur and Poonch divisions.

== Demographics ==
=== Social groups ===
Gujjar is a major ethnic in Muzaffarabad division. Gurjars make up roughly 30.54% of the total population of Muzaffarabad division, with a population of 3,27,439. (Note: Gujjars make up 35% of the population in Muzaffarabad (2,27,629) and Hattian Bala (80,685) districts & 10% in Neelum district (19,125).) Other ethnic groups found in the division are Sayeds, Rajgan, Mughal, Kashmiris and Rajput.

=== Language ===
Main language spoken in Muzaffarabad division are Gujari and Pahari. Gujari is the language of 30.54% population of the division it is mainly spoken by 35% in Muzaffarabad and Hattian Bala districts and 10% by the Gujjar population in Neelum District. Other languages including Kashmiri, Urdu, Hindko, Punjabi and Dogri also spoken.

== Districts ==
Map of Muzaffarabad Division

Currently, the Muzaffarabad Division consists of the following districts:

District	Area (km²)	Pop. (2017)	Density (ppl/km²) (2017)	Literacy rate (2017)	Union Councils
Muzaffarabad District	1,642	650,370	394		
Hattian Bala District	854	230,529	270		
Neelam District	3,621	191,251	53		

== Public health ==
According to a 2020 report by the Ministry of National Health Services, Regulations, & Coordination, the infant mortality rate of Muzaffarabad district was 58 per 1,000 live births, notably higher than the national average for Pakistan. A contributing factor to this may be the influence of powdered formula usage instead of breastfeeding. Localized clinical studies show that more than half of women in Muzaffarabad use formula milk, and face several barriers in order to productively breastfeed their kids (lack of provision of time to breastfeed, task adjustment during lactation period, separate room for nursing, etc.).
