= Bagh, Azad Kashmir =

Pakistani city

Bagh باغ
- City
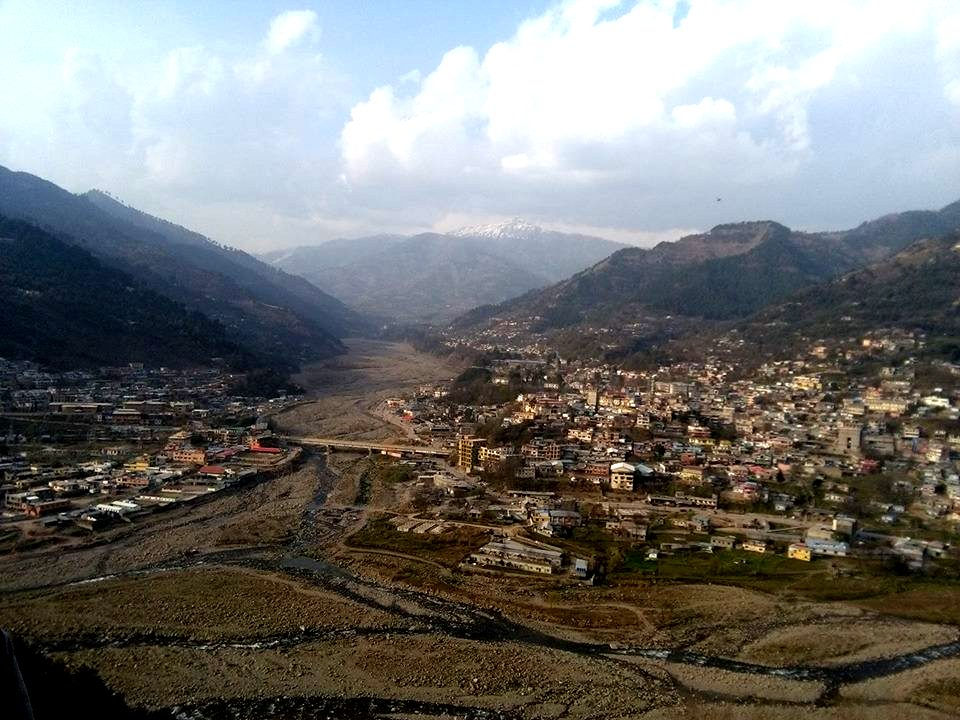
- Bagh city view

- Location within Azad Kashmir
- Coordinates: 33.9735°N 73.7918°E
- Administering country: Pakistan
- Dependent Territory: Azad Kashmir
- District: Bagh

Area
  - Total: 22 km^{2} (8.5 sq mi)
- Elevation: 1,676 m (5,499 ft)

Population (2017)
  - Total: 33,548
  - Density: 1,500/km^{2} (3,900/sq mi)

Languages
  - Official: Urdu
- Time zone: PST
- GPO: 12500
- Website: http://www.bagh.com.pk

Bagh City (Urdu: باغ) is the chief town and district headquarters of Bagh District, in Azad Kashmir, Pakistan. The town is situated on the confluence of two nullahs (streams), Malwani and Mahl (ماہلوانی اور ماہل) at a distance of 93 km from Muzaffarabad.

== 2005 earthquake ==
On 8 October 2005, Bagh was hit by a devastating earthquake that killed 8,500 people, which represented 10% of the population. Most of the victims were children attending school who died when the school buildings collapsed. The worst hit institutes were a school named Spring Field Children academy (where 300 plus children died in junior campus), the boys' degree college and girls' degree college Bagh. Many lives could have been saved if the rescue equipment was available. The entire city was destroyed and was rebuilt with the help of government.

== Geography ==
Bagh is located 80 kilometres from Muzaffarabad, the capital city of Azad Kashmir. It is 160 kilometres from Islamabad, the capital of Pakistan.

Topographically, the district is quite mountainous with lush green pine forests on the mountain slopes leading into the valleys. The altitude of Bagh Valley is 1038 m. Major peaks near Bagh include Kobra Peak. Ganga Choti and Lasdana are the highest peaks of Bagh. Whereas Rawàlakot and Forward Khauta are two cities connected to Bagh as all lies in sudnothi division of Kashmir.

== See also ==
- Kharal Abbasian
