= Muzaffarabad District =

District in Azad Kashmir, Pakistan

Muzaffarabad District ضلع مُظفّرآباد
- District of Azad Kashmir administered by Pakistan
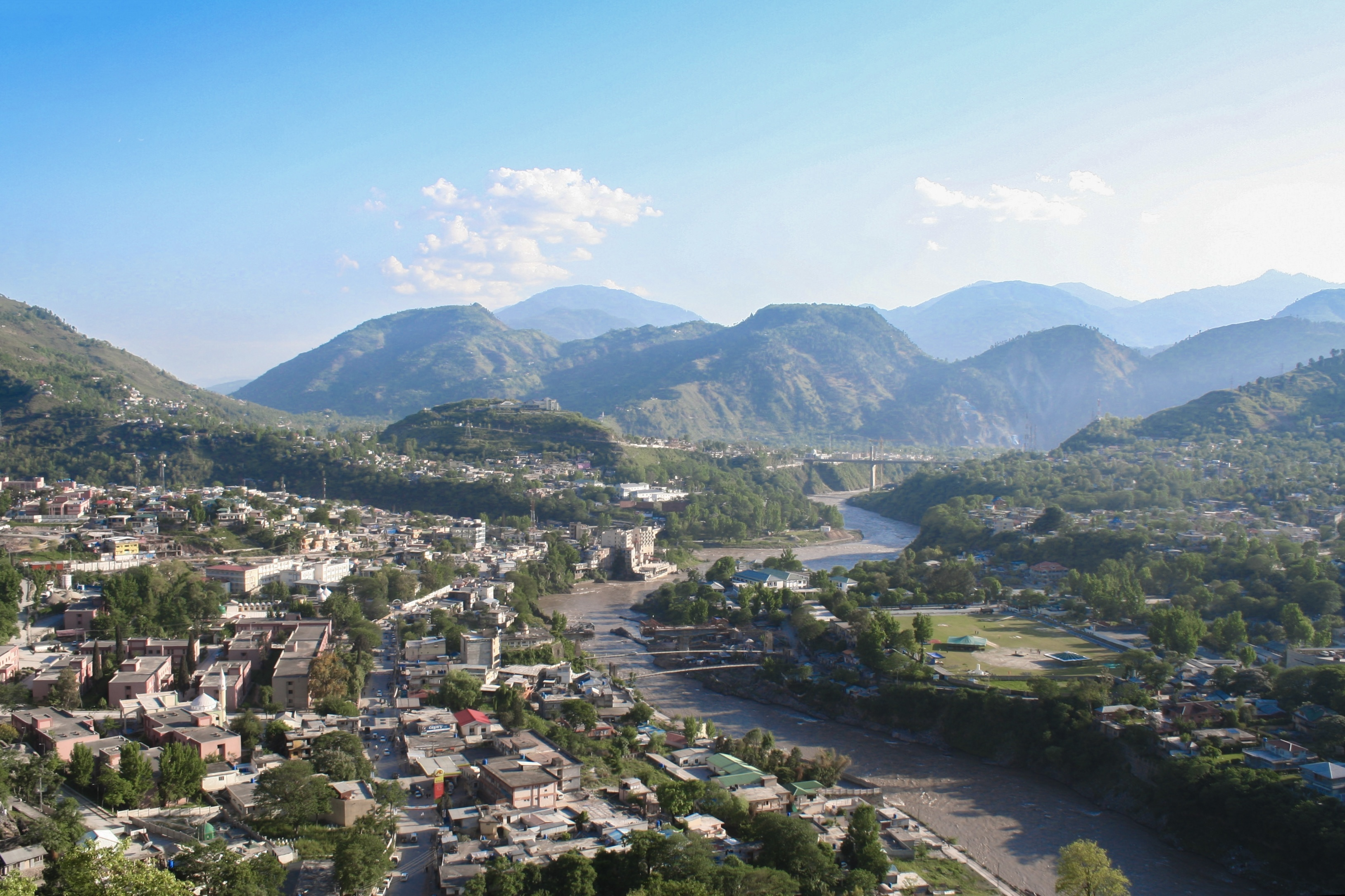
- The city of Muzaffarabad, Azad Kashmir
- Interactive map of Muzaffarabad district
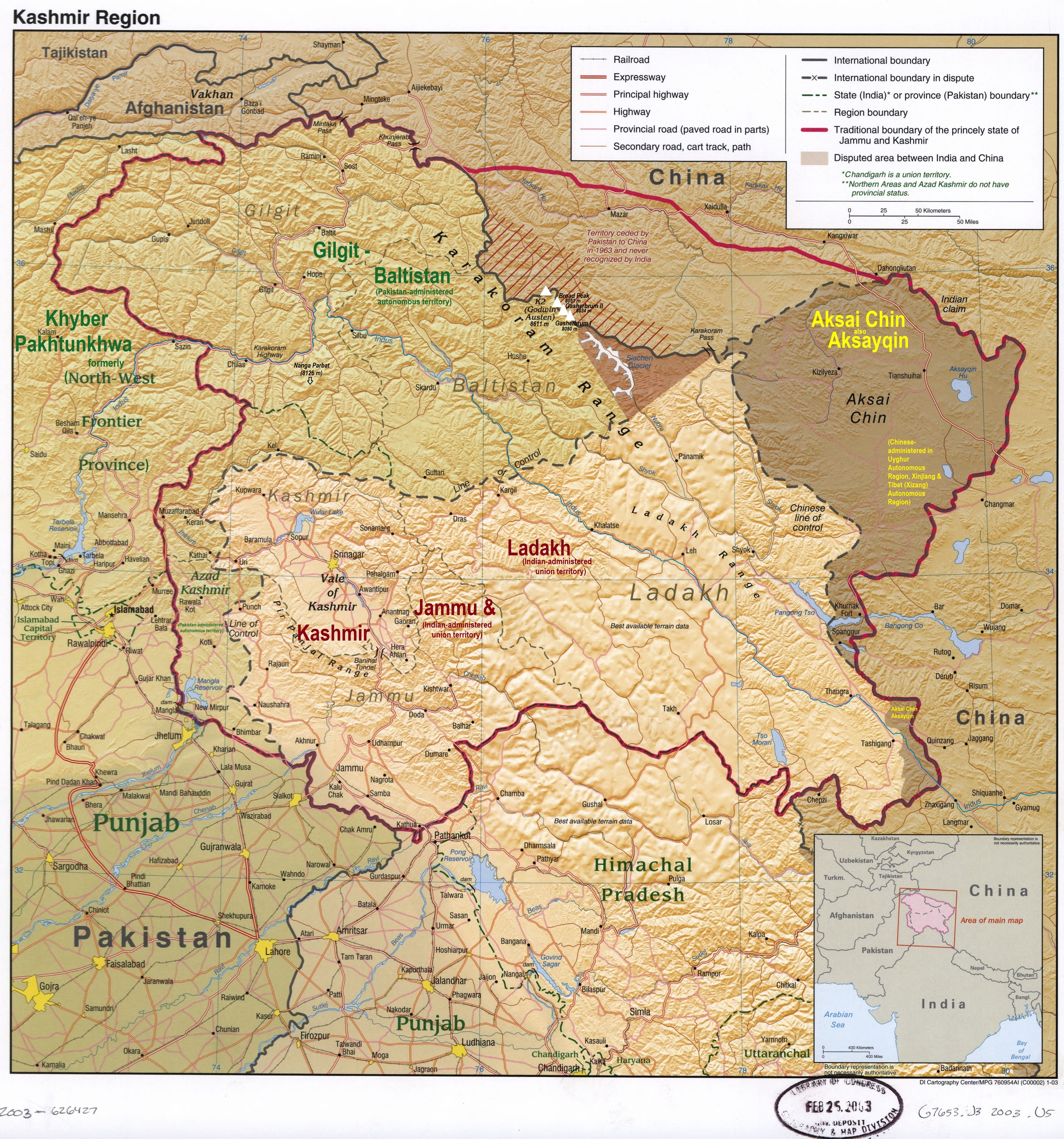
- A map showing Pakistani-administered Gilgit-Baltistan (shaded in sage green) in the disputed Kashmir region
- Coordinates (Muzaffarabad): 34°20′N 73°36′E
- Administering country: Pakistan
- Territory: Azad Kashmir
- Division: Muzaffarabad Division
- Headquarters: Muzaffarabad

Government
  - Type: District Administration
  - Deputy Commissioner: Mudassar Farooq
  - District Police Officer: N/A
  - District Education Officer Male/Female: N/A
  - District Nazim: Imtiaz Ahmad Abbasi

Area
  - Total: 1,642 km^{2} (634 sq mi)

Population (2017)
  - Total: 650,370
  - Density: 396/km^{2} (1,030/sq mi)

Languages
  - Official: Urdu
  - Spoken: Pahari, Gujari; Kashmiri
- Number of Tehsils: 3

The Muzaffarabad District (Urdu: ضلع مُظفّرآباد) is a district of Pakistan-administered Azad Kashmir in the disputed Kashmir region. It is one of the 10 districts of this dependent territory. The district is located on the banks of the Jhelum and Neelum rivers and is very hilly. The total area of the Muzaffarabad District is 1,642 square kilometres (634 sq mi). The district is part of the Muzaffarabad Division, and the city of Muzaffarabad serves as the capital of Azad Kashmir. The district is bounded on the north-east by the Neelum District and the Kupwara district of Indian-administered Jammu and Kashmir region, on the south-east by the Hattian Bala District, on the south by the Bagh District, and on the west by the Mansehra and Abbottabad districts of Pakistan's Khyber Pakhtunkhwa Province.

A map of Azad Kashmir with the Muzaffarabad District highlighted in red

== Demographics ==
The total population of the district, according to the 2017 census, is 650,370.

=== Social groups ===
Gujjar is a major ethnic group of Muzaffarabad district and Azad Kashmir they make up to 35% of total population of the district and they mainly speak Gujari as their mother tongue. Other Ethnic groups of the district are Bombas, Sayeds, Rajput, Mughal and Bukhari.

=== Language ===
Two major languages spoken in the district are Pahari and Gujari. In Muzaffarabad District Pahari is spoken by 50% Pahari (including all dialects), 35% Gujari, and 15% Kashmiri individuals.

1. Pahari (50.0%)
2. Gujari (Gojri) (35.0%)
3. Kashmiri (15.0%)

Pahari is generally considered to be a variety of Western Punjabi. It is occasionally referred to as Chibhali or Poonchi, but locally known as Hindko. Its speakers tend to identify more with the Hindko spoken to the west, even though perceiving their speech to be only slightly different from the Pahari varieties spoken in the Bagh District and further south in Murree. The local dialect has a higher percentage of shared basic vocabulary with the central group of Pahari dialects (83–88%) than with the Hindko of the nearby Mansehra and Abbottabad districts (73–79%). Gujari, native to around a third of its population. The local dialect is closely related to the Gujari varieties spoken in Hazara (83–88% similarity in basic vocabulary) and the rest of Azad Kashmir (79–86%). Kashmiri is spoken in the city of Muzaffarabad. It is distinct from, although still intelligible with, the Kashmiri of the Neelam Valley to the north.

== Administrative divisions ==
The Muzaffarabad district is made up of three main tehsils (sub divisions): Muzaffarabad, Hattian and Authmaqam. It has 38 Union Councils, 581 villages and 79 Patwar Circles (Patwar Khana).

- Muzaffarabad Tehsil
- Pattika Tehsil

== Education ==
Muzaffarabad's education system exhibits a disparity between its overall ranking and school infrastructure. While the district achieved a national ranking of 6th with a score of 73.85 in the 2017 Pakistan District Education Ranking (by Alif Ailaan), its school infrastructure score was significantly lower at 105th with a score of 34.29. This disparity highlights a lack of basic amenities in many schools, including electricity (11.7 score), drinking water (27.93 score), and boundary walls (40.09 score). These shortcomings create an environment not conducive to learning.

Furthermore, the district faces a shortage of higher-level educational institutions. With 72% of schools being primary and only 28% offering above-primary education, students graduating from primary schools have limited options for continuing their education. This limited access, particularly for girls, contributes to a decline in enrollment rates.

== Bibliography ==
- Abbasi, Muhammad Gulfraz (2010). "Is It a Language Worth Researching?". Language in India. 10 (7).
- Akhtar, Raja Nasim; Rehman, Khawaja A. (2007). "The Languages of the Neelam Valley". Kashmir Journal of Language Research. 10 (1): 65–84. ISSN 1028-6640.
- Grierson, George A. (1919). Linguistic Survey of India. Vol. VIII, Part 1, Indo-Aryan family. North-western group. Specimens of Sindhī and Lahndā. Calcutta: Office of the Superintendent of Government Printing, India.
- Hallberg, Calinda E.; O'Leary, Clare F. (1992). "Dialect Variation and Multilingualism among Gujars of Pakistan". In O'Leary, Clare F.; Rensch, Calvin R.; Hallberg, Calinda E. (eds.). Hindko and Gujari. Sociolinguistic Survey of Northern Pakistan. Islamabad: National Institute of Pakistan Studies, Quaid-i-Azam University and Summer Institute of Linguistics. pp. 91–196. ISBN 969-8023-13-5.
- Lothers, Michael; Lothers, Laura (2010). Pahari and Pothwari: a sociolinguistic survey (Report). SIL Electronic Survey Reports. Vol. 2010–012.
- Shakil, Mohsin (2012). "Languages of Erstwhile State of Jammu Kashmir (A Preliminary Study)". p. 12.
