= Hattian Bala District =

District in Azad Kashmir, Pakistan

Hattian Bala District ضلع ہٹیاں بالا
- District of Azad Kashmir administered by Pakistan (Note: The application of the term "administered" to the various regions of Kashmir and a mention of the Kashmir dispute is supported by the tertiary sources (a) through (e), reflecting due weight in the coverage. Although "controlled" and "held" are also applied neutrally to the names of the disputants or to the regions administered by them, as evidenced in sources (h) through (i) below, "held" is also considered politicized usage, as is the term "occupied," (see (j) below). (a) Kashmir, region Indian subcontinent, Encyclopaedia Britannica (subscription required) Quote: "Kashmir, a region of the northwestern Indian subcontinent ... has been the subject of dispute between India and Pakistan since the partition of the Indian subcontinent in 1947. The northern and western portions are administered by Pakistan and comprise three areas: Azad Kashmir, Gilgit, and Baltistan, the last two being part of a territory called the Northern Areas. Administered by India are the southern and southeastern portions, which constitute the state of Jammu and Kashmir but are slated to be split into two union territories."; (b) Pletcher, Kenneth, Aksai Chin, Plateau Region, Asia, Encyclopaedia Britannica (subscription required) Quote: "Aksai Chin, Chinese (Pinyin) Aksayqin, portion of the Kashmir region, at the northernmost extent of the Indian subcontinent in south-central Asia. It constitutes nearly all the territory of the Chinese-administered sector of Kashmir that is claimed by India to be part of the Ladakh area of Jammu and Kashmir state."; (c) "Kashmir", Encyclopaedia Americana, Scholastic Library Publishing, 2006, p. 328, ISBN 978-0-7172-0139-6 C. E Bosworth, University of Manchester Quote: "KASHMIR, kash'mer, the northernmost region of the Indian subcontinent, administered partlv by India, partly by Pakistan, and partly by China. The region has been the subject of a bitter dispute between India and Pakistan since they became independent in 1947"; (d) Osmańczyk, Edmund Jan (2003), Encyclopaedia of the United Nations and International Agreements: G to M, Taylor & Francis, pp. 1191–, ISBN 978-0-415-93922-5 Quote: "Jammu and Kashmir: Territory in northwestern India, subject to a dispute between India and Pakistan. It has borders with Pakistan and China." (e) Talbot, Ian (2016), A History of Modern South Asia: Politics, States, Diasporas, Yale University Press, pp. 28–29, ISBN 978-0-300-19694-8 Quote: "We move from a disputed international border to a dotted line on the map that represents a military border not recognized in international law. The line of control separates the Indian and Pakistani administered areas of the former Princely State of Jammu and Kashmir."; (f) Skutsch, Carl (2015) [2007], "China: Border War with India, 1962", in Ciment, James (ed.), Encyclopaedia of Conflicts Since World War II (2nd ed.), London and New York: Routledge, p. 573, ISBN 978-0-7656-8005-1, "The situation between the two nations was complicated by the 1957–1959 uprising by Tibetans against Chinese rule. Refugees poured across the Indian border, and the Indian public was outraged. Any compromise with China on the border issue became impossible. Similarly, China was offended that India had given political asylum to the Dalai Lama when he fled across the border in March 1959. In late 1959, there were shots fired between border patrols operating along both the ill-defined McMahon Line and in the Aksai Chin." (g) Clary, Christopher (2022), The Difficult Politics of Peace: Rivalry in Modern South Asia, Oxford and New York: Oxford University Press, p. 109, ISBN 9780197638408, "Territorial Dispute: The situation along the Sino-Indian frontier continued to worsen. In late July (1959), an Indian reconnaissance patrol was blocked, "apprehended," and eventually expelled after three weeks in custody at the hands of a larger Chinese force near Khurnak Fort in Aksai Chin. ... Circumstances worsened further in October 1959, when a major class at Kongka Pass in eastern Ladakh led to nine dead and ten captured Indian border personnel, making it by far the most serious Sino-Indian class since India's independence." (h) Bose, Sumantra (2009), Kashmir: Roots of Conflict, Paths to Peace, Harvard University Press, pp. 294, 291, 293, ISBN 978-0-674-02855-5 Quote: "J&K: Jammu and Kashmir. The former princely state that is the subject of the Kashmir dispute. Besides IJK (Indian-controlled Jammu and Kashmir. The larger and more populous part of the former princely state. It has a population of slightly over 10 million, and comprises three regions: Kashmir Valley, Jammu, and Ladakh.) and AJK ('Azad" (Free) Jammu and Kashmir. The more populous part of Pakistani-controlled J&K, with a population of approximately 2.5 million.), it includes the sparsely populated "Northern Areas" of Gilgit and Baltistan, remote mountainous regions which are directly administered, unlike AJK, by the Pakistani central authorities, and some high-altitude uninhabitable tracts under Chinese control." (i) Fisher, Michael H. (2018), An Environmental History of India: From Earliest Times to the Twenty-First Century, Cambridge University Press, p. 166, ISBN 978-1-107-11162-2 Quote: "Kashmir’s identity remains hotly disputed with a UN-supervised “Line of Control” still separating Pakistani-held Azad (“Free”) Kashmir from Indian-held Kashmir."; (j) Snedden, Christopher (2015), Understanding Kashmir and Kashmiris, Oxford University Press, p. 10, ISBN 978-1-84904-621-3 Quote:"Some politicized terms also are used to describe parts of J&K. These terms include the words 'occupied' and 'held'.")
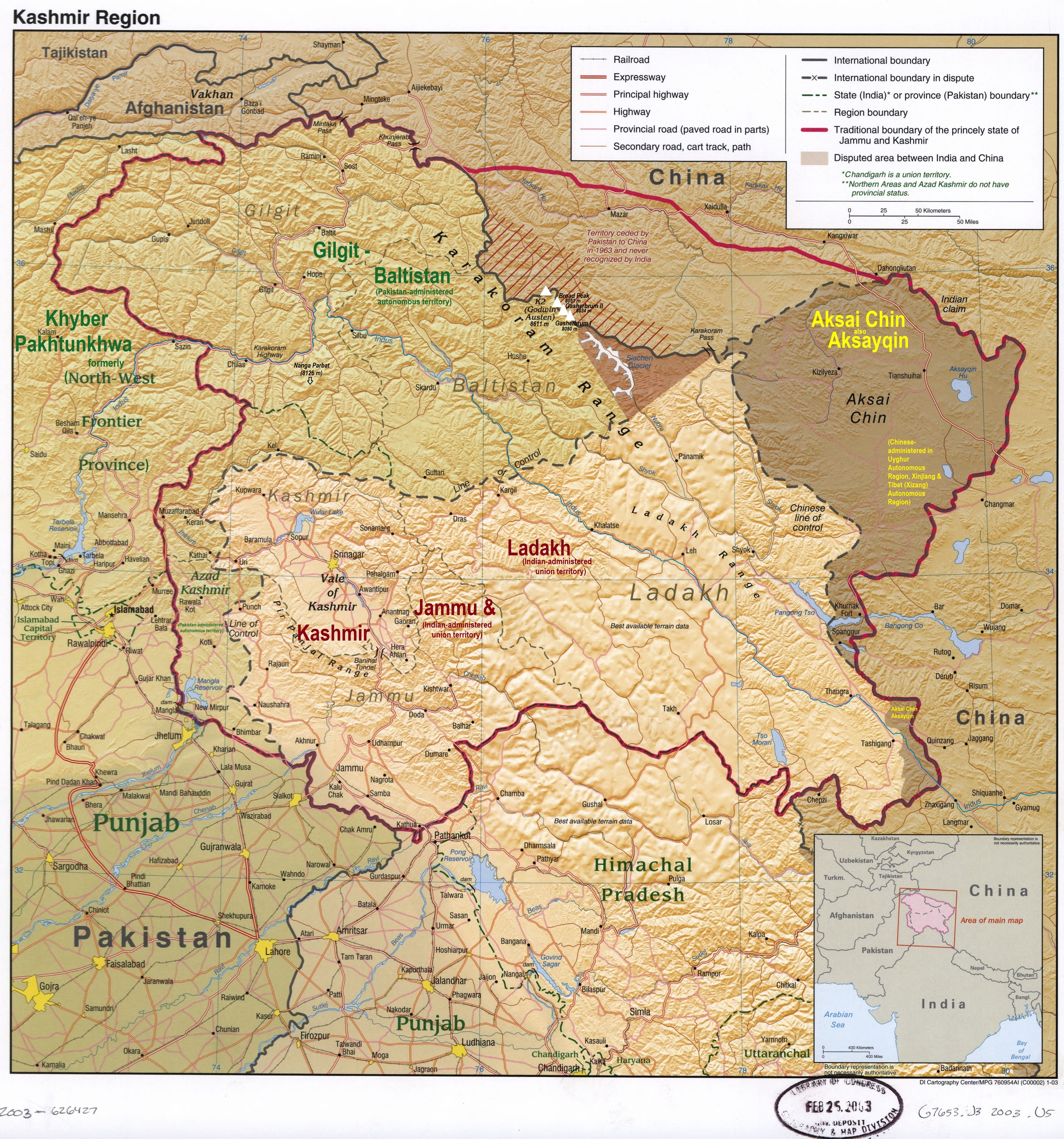
- A map showing Pakistani-administered Azad Kashmir (shaded in sage green) in the disputed Kashmir region
- Interactive map of Hattian Bala District
- Coordinates (Hattian Bala): 34°12′N 73°47′E
- Administering country: Pakistan
- Territory: Azad Kashmir
- Division: Muzaffarabad Division
- Headquarters: Hattian Bala

Government
  - Type: District Administration
  - Deputy Commissioner: Beenish Jaral
  - District Police Officer: N/A
  - District Health Officer: N/A

Area
  - Land: 854 km^{2} (330 sq mi)

Population (2017)
  - Total: 230,529
  - Density: 270/km^{2} (700/sq mi)

Languages
  - Official: Urdu
  - Local: Pahari; Gujari; Kashmiri
- Number of Tehsils: 3

Hattian Bala District (Urdu: ضلع ہٹیاں بالا) is a district of Pakistan-administered Azad Kashmir in the disputed Kashmir region. The town of Hattian Bala is where the district headquarters are located. The Hattian Bala District was a part of the Muzaffarabad District until 2009 when it was made a separate district.

Map of Azad Kashmir with the Hattian Bala District highlighted in red

== History ==
The Hattian Bala District was a part of the Uri Tehsil of the Muzaffarabad District in Jammu and Kashmir, following the end of the first conflict between India and Pakistan. The initial clash between India and Pakistan ended with a truce, and Hattian Bala was separated from Uri Tehsil. The Leepa Valley sector of the historic Karnah Tehsil (Neelum District) had been made a non contiguous part of Karnah Tehsil and thereforth became a part of Hattian Bala District. The district of Hattian Bala was created in July 2009 under Sardar Muhammad Yaqoob Khan's coalition government in Azad Kashmir.

== Demographics ==
=== Social groups ===
Gujjar is a major ethnic group of Hattian Bala district and Azad Kashmir they make up to 35% of total population of the district and they mainly speak Gujari as their mother tongue.

=== Language ===
Two major languages spoken in the district are Pahari and Gujari. In Muzaffarabad District Pahari is spoken by 50% Pahari (including all dialects), 35% Gujari, and 15% Kashmiri individuals.

Languages of Hattian Bala.
1. Pahari (50.0%)
2. Gojri (35.0%)
3. Kashmiri (15.0%)

== Geography ==
There are two districts of Indian-administered Jammu and Kashmir bordering it on the north and east, and Bagh District and Muzaffarabad on the south. It has a population of 230,529 people.

== Administrative divisions ==
The Hattian Bala District consists of three tehsils:

- Chikkar Tehsil
- Hattian Bala Tehsil
- Leepa Tehsil

The district council of Hattian Bala has 12 union councils (consisting of eight UCs from Constituency No. 5 and four UCs from Constituency No. 6), one municipal committee at Hattian, and one town committee at Chikar. The Rural Development Department (RDD) has three centers: Hattian, Leepa, and Chikar. The assistant director of Local Government & RDD Hattian is the administrative officer for rural development, with two project managers at each center.

== Infrastructure ==
Hattian Bala District faces chronic infrastructure challenges, with narrow, poorly maintained roads and limited emergency services posing serious risks to residents. Despite repeated demands, successive governments have neglected meaningful development in the region.

This ongoing neglect was evident in July 2025 when a school van accident near Tambryal Mor injured several students, highlighting the dangerous condition of local roads and lack of safety measures.

== Education ==
According to the Alif Ailaan Pakistan District Education Rankings 2015, the Hattian Bala District is ranked 28 out of 148 districts in terms of education. For facilities and infrastructure, the district is ranked 112 out of 148. The district has few colleges, so many people in the district attend the Allama Iqbal Open University or the AJK University at its main Muzaffarabad campus, at its Neelum campus, or at the recently inaugurated Hattian Bala campus, which has faculties for the teaching of the English Language, computer science, and business administration. Two areas in the district are renowned for education, having high literacy rates: Leepa Valley and the village of Pahal, located near the LOC. The district also has some private institutions, such as the READ Foundation Science College Hattian Bala, the READ Foundation Science College Chenari, and the Smart School Hattian Bala.
