= Dowarian =

Village in Neelum Valley, Azad Kashmir, Pakistan

- Village
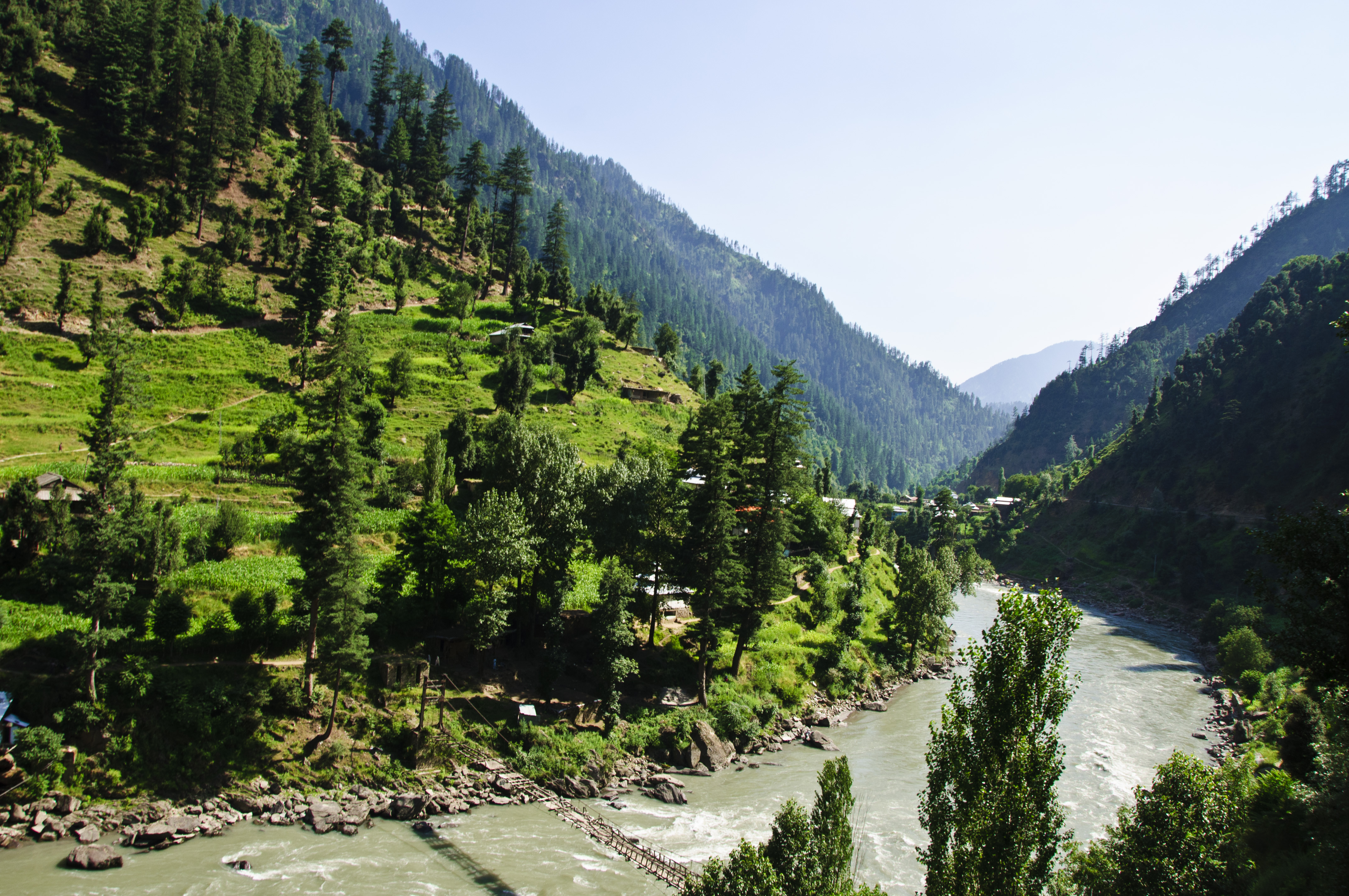

- Location within Azad Kashmir
- Coordinates: 34.7251°N 74.0021°E
- Country: Pakistan
- State: Azad Kashmir
- District: Neelum
- Elevation: 1,615 m (5,299 ft)

Languages
  - Official: Urdu
  - Local: Kashmiri
- Time zone: PST

Dowarian (Urdu: دواریاں) is a village in Neelum Valley, Azad Kashmir, Pakistan. It is located 106 kilometers (66 mi) from Muzaffarabad and 22 kilometers (14 mi) from Athmuqam on the bank of Neelum River at the altitude of 1,615 meters (5,299 ft).

Dowarian is accessible by Neelum road from Muzaffarabad. A rest house of AJK Tourism and Archeology Department is located here for tourists to stay. It is the base camp to Ratti Gali Lake. Dowarian is located at the merger of river Neelam and Ratti Gali water stream. There are tourism and forest rest houses. The village is full of spring waters, high green mountains and plants. Walnuts, mulberries, Cherries and apples are produced in the village. A secondary school was established in 1972 and it was promoted to higher secondary in 2016, and there are multiple other schools engaged in the provision of education to the masses. Girls High School Dowarian was destroyed in the flood of 2010 and has not been re-constructed yet. The village also has a Civil Dispensary run by the government of AJK, Pakistan.

== See also ==
- Kundal Shahi
- Kutton
- Athmuqam
- Sharda
- Kel
