= Kundal Shahi bridge collapse =

2018 footbridge collapse in Azad Kashmir, Pakistan

Kundal Shahi Bridge collapse
- Date: May 13, 2018
- Time: 1:40 PM (PST) and 13:40 (UTC)
- Location: Kutton Jagran, Jagran Nullah Stream, Neelum River, Kundal Shahi, Neelam Valley, Azad Kashmir, Pakistan; 34.5631°N 73.8046°E
- Type: Bridge collapse
- Cause: Excessive weight
- Deaths: 6
- Injuries: 11+
- Missing: 6

On Sunday, 13 May 2018, a steel bridge known as Kundal Shahi (locally "Jagran Bridge") in Kutton Jagran, over Jagran Nullah (Nala Jagran) stream of Neelum River in Kundal Shahi collapsed due to an excessive weight levied on it, when groups of 25 (some reported 34-40) tourists mainly of whom were university students from Lahore, Faisalabad, Multan and Sahiwal taking pictures on it. Research operation was launched immediately and it was confirmed that six people died during the incident, while eight were rescued and six went missing.

== Incident ==
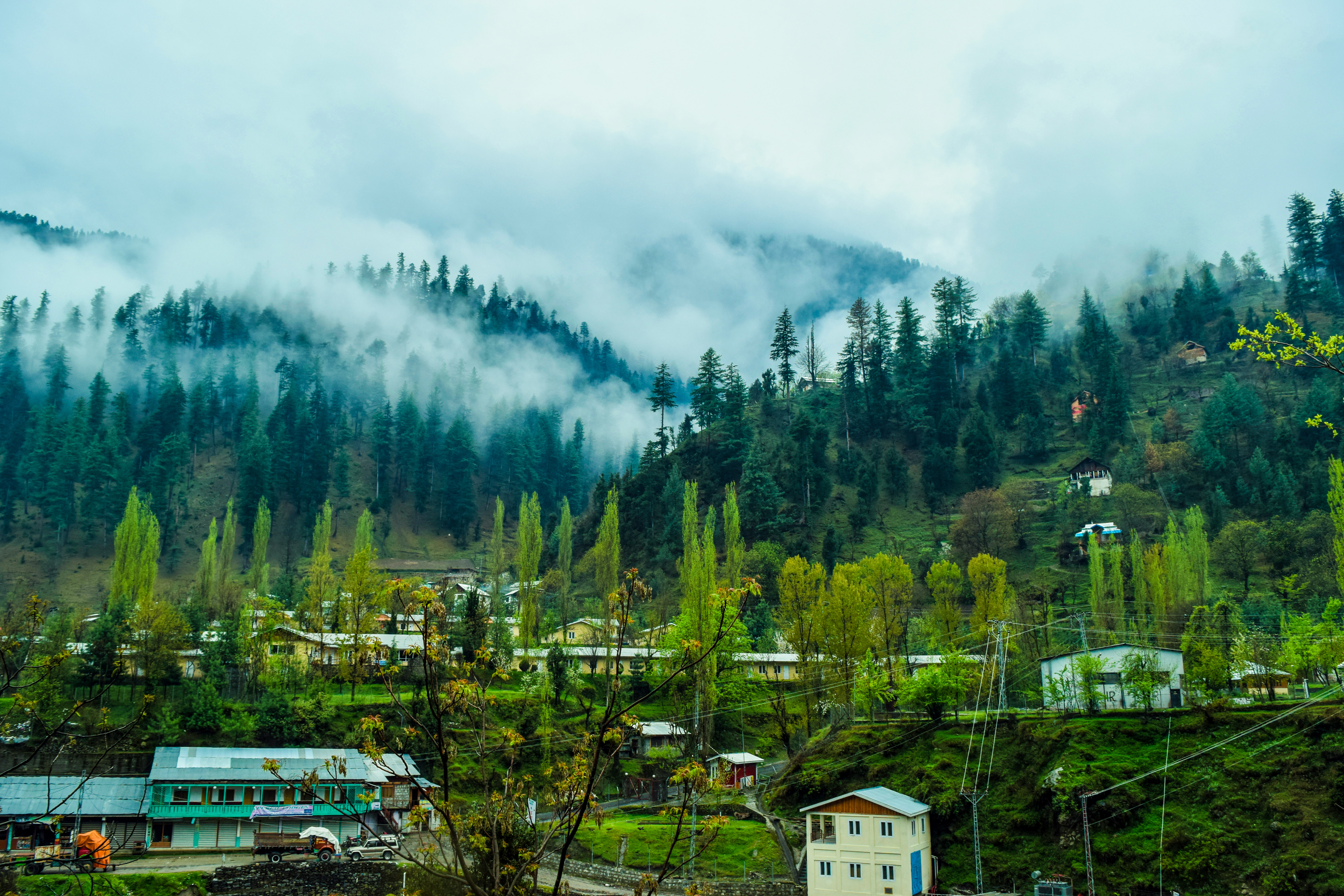
Kutton, Neelam Valley view in Azad Kashmir, Pakistan

On Sunday, May 13, 2018, around 20-25 tourists, mainly students, hailing from the eastern and southern cities of Punjab: Faisalabad, Multan and some were from Lahore and Sahiwal drowned when they were taking pictures on the Jagran Bridge situated over Jagran Nullah stream in Kutton village (also known as Jagran Valley) - that later enters into Neelum River in Kundal Shahi, Neelam Valley, Azad Kashmir, Pakistan.

Red Crescent Society of AJK was the first one to reach the site and started rescuing the victims. Official rescue Operation was launched immediately, while the bridge was constructed eight years ago to connect the valley and was made of wood. It was in feeble condition and could only uphold the weight of four people at a time. Tourists, despite warning notice and previous year's incident, ignored the danger. Inter-Services Public Relations also announced that “Pakistan Army rescue and relief efforts [are] under way… [and] army troops along with doctors and paramedics have reached the incident site,”The collapsing of bridge was recorded live by the tourists."

Deputy Commissioner of Neelum District, Raja Shahid account the details of incident saying, "some 72 tourist students were traveling in three different coaches to Neelum Valley. Some of the students among them later visited Kundal Shahi, a tourist spot of Kuton Jagran and at least 26 students gathered on the Jagran hanging bridge built on a deep gulch for taking their selfies, ignoring the warning mentioned on the board of the bridge. The bridge collapsed due to overweight and the students fell into deep speedy water."

Javed Ayub a senior tourism department official in Azad Kashmir said that "14 students were rescued after the bridge collapsed and that civil and military rescue teams were searching for 11 others," stating further he said, "rescue workers recovered the bodies of 5 drowned students. The students, most in their early 20s, were enrolled in the medical college at Faisalabad in eastern Punjab province. He said some students from a college in Lahore were also among those who fell into the river." Emphasizing on the danger of the bridge already he said, "the touring youths have not realized the danger despite a warning board asking people not to overload the old structure.”

The police superintendent of Neelum Valley, Mirza Zahid Hussain said, "though we are yet to confirm an exact figure, it is believed that between 20 to 25 persons were standing on the footbridge when it crumbled. The violent current immediately swept away the victims; so far, six bodies have been recovered.”

Farooq Haider Khan the PM of AJK, setup the control room in Muzafarabad for the victim's families, and PKR200,000 was announced as a compensation for the diseased and the injured.

PM Abbassi awarded compensation of PKR. 4 million to two families who made considerable efforts to save the victims.

== Reactions ==
- Prime Minister Shahid Khaqan Abbasi, expressed his grief and "has directed all the departments concerned to expedite the rescue efforts."
- Chief Ministers of Punjab Shehbaz Sharif, has also conveyed his condolences and extended "his sympathies to the families of those who were affected in this horrible incident."
- Prime Minister of Azad Kashmir Farooq Haider Khan, reached the incident site personally and supervised the rescue operation.
- Chief of Army Staff General Qamar Javed Bajwa, directed all possible assistance to civil administration for relief and rescue operations.
- PTI leader of Azad Kashmir Legislative Assembly and former tourism and information minister in AJK, Abdul Majid Khan - said, “What happened at Kundal Shahi today is a clarion call for us to take swift action and upgrade the facilities for the visitors to save tourism industry.”
- Former President and head of PPP Asif Ali Zardari, said "he was saddened by the news of collapsing of a bridge in Neelum Valley. He said his thoughts were with the victims and their families. He instructed party leaders of AJK and FATA to reach out to the affectees of both incidents and provide them help."
