= Upper Neelam =

Neelam
- Village
- Location within Azad Kashmir
- Coordinates: 34.6593°N 73.9376°E
- Country: Pakistan
- State: Azad Kashmir
- District: Neelam
- Elevation: 1,524 m (5,000 ft)

Languages
  - Official: Urdu
- Time zone: UTC+05:00 (PST)

Upper Neelam (Also spelled Neelum) (Urdu: نیلم) is a village in Neelam District, Azad Kashmir, Pakistan. It is located 93 km (58 mi) from Muzaffarabad and 9 km (5.6 mi) from Athmuqam Tehsil on the bank of Neelum River at the altitude of 1,524 m (5,000 ft). Keran is 2.5 km (1.6 mile) away from here.

The adjacent village on the other side of the Neelum river in Indian Kashmir. The differentiation of this village to other is the mountain view of the other side is India.

== See also ==
- Kundal Shahi
- Kutton
- Athmuqam Tehsil
- Sharda Tehsil
- Kel
