= AJK Tourism and Archaeology Department =

Government department in Azad Jammu and Kashmir, Pakistan

AJK Tourism and Archaeology Department is a department of Azad Jammu and Kashmir Government in Pakistan. The main aim of this department is to promote travel and tourism in Azad Kashmir. The department provides information and accommodation facilities to tourists in different places in state. It also arranges fairs, festivals and events to promote tourism.

The head office of the department is located in Muzaffarabad. Some regional and information offices are located in different places in Azad Kashmir.

== Huts and lodges ==
District Neelam

- Tourist Lodge, Kutton
- Tourist Lodge, Keran
- Tourist Motel, Keran
- Tourist Huts, Neelam Village
- Tourist Lodge, Dowarian
- Tourist Lodge, Sharda
- Youth Hostel 1, Sharda
- Youth Hostel 2, Sharda
- Tourist Motel, Kel
- Tourist Motels Taobat

District Muzaffarabad

- Tourist Lodge, Shaheed Gali
- Tourist Lodge, Danna
- Tourist Lodge, Saran
- Tourist Lodge, Bersala

District Bagh

- Tourist Lodge, Sudhan Gali
- Tourist Huts (3), Dhirkot
- Tourist Lodge, Neela Butt
- Tourist Lodge, Las Danna
- Tourist Lodge, Kotla
- Tourist Lodge, Ganga Choti
- Tourist Lodge, Panjal Mastan National Park
- Tourist Lodge, Naza Gali
- Tourist Lodge, Nanga Pir

District Poonch

- Tourist Lodge, Paniola
- Tourist Lodge, Koyian
- Tourist Lodge, Banjosa
- Tourist Lodge, Ghori Mar
- Tourist Lodge, Tatta Pani

District Sudhnoti

- Tourist lodge, Dana Pothimeer Khan
- Tourist lodge, Kelaan Bloch
- Tourist lodge, Gorah valley
- Tourist lodge, kaanqadi kotkotli nakr
- Tourist lodge, Dana nagesher

District Kotli

- Tourist Lodge, Sarda
- Tourist Lodge, Teenda
- Tourist Lodge, Fatehpur

District Mirpur

- Tourist Hut, Mirpur

District Bhimber

- Tourist Lodge, Jandi Chontra
