= Taobat =

Village in Pakistan-administered Azad Kashmir

Taobat تاؤبٹ
- Village
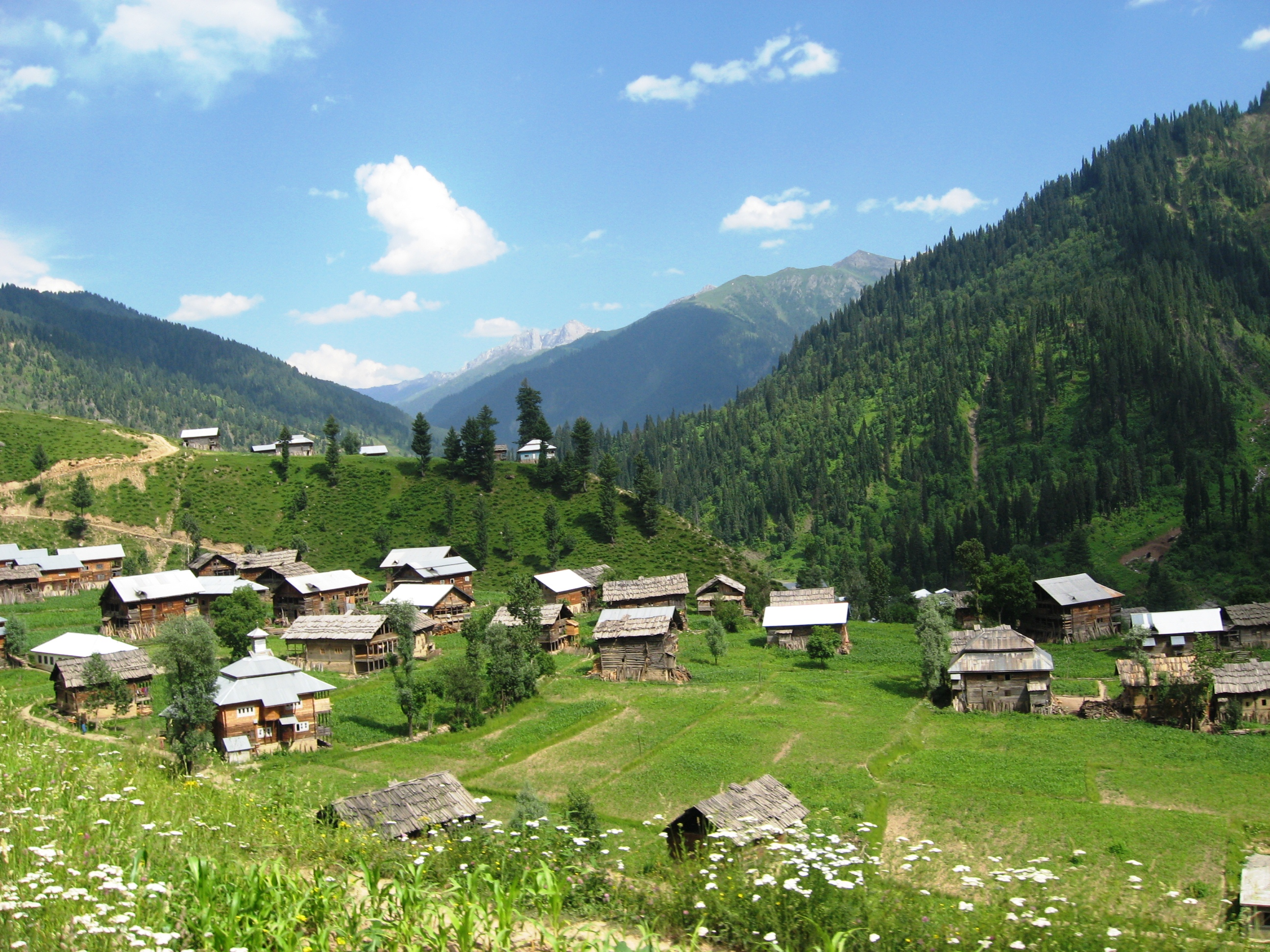
- Taobat Village, Neelum Valley, Kashmir

- Location within Azad Kashmir
- Coordinates: 34.7271°N 74.7125°E
- Country: Pakistan
- Territory: Azad Kashmir
- District: Neelam
- Elevation: 2,300 m (7,500 ft)

Languages
  - Official: Urdu
  - Local: Kashmiri, Shina
- Time zone: PST

Taobat (Urdu: تاؤبٹ) is a village in Sharda Tehsil in Neelam Valley, Azad Kashmir, Pakistan. It is located 200 kilometers (120 mi) from Muzaffarabad and 39 kilometers (24 mi) from Kel. It is the last station in Neelam valley. It is also the nearest location from where Neelam River enters Pakistani territory and becomes River Neelum. In 1998 it had a population of 720.

Taobat was part of Baramulla district before 1947, although it was neither geographically, culturally, nor linguistically part of the Kashmir Valley. It is accessible from Kel by unmetalled road. There is a motel of AJK Tourism and Archeology Department and a small number of hotels.

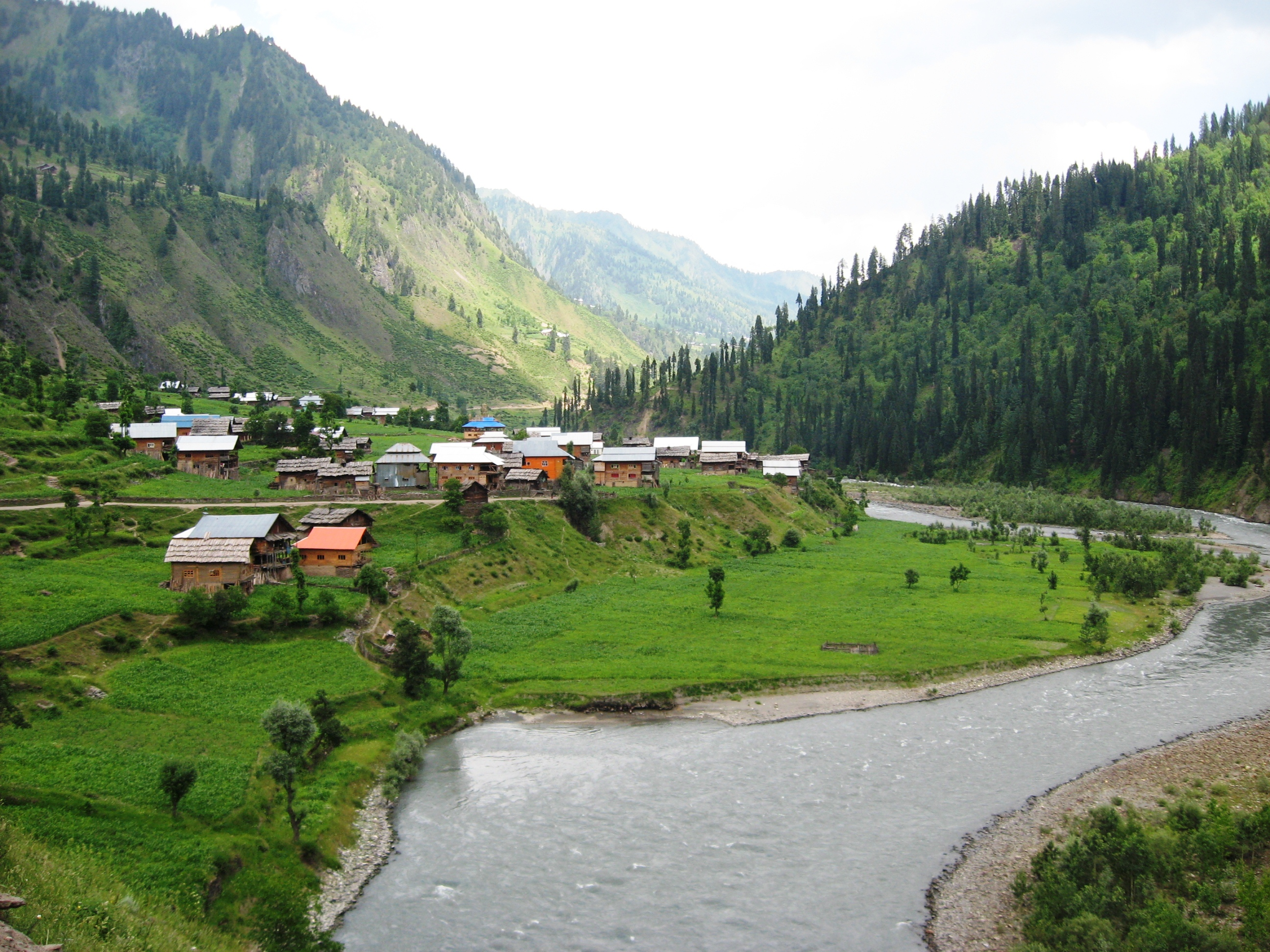
Taobat Village, Neelum Valley

== See also ==
- Minimarg
- Halmat
- Sharda
