= Banjosa Lake, Rawalakot =

Banjosa Lake
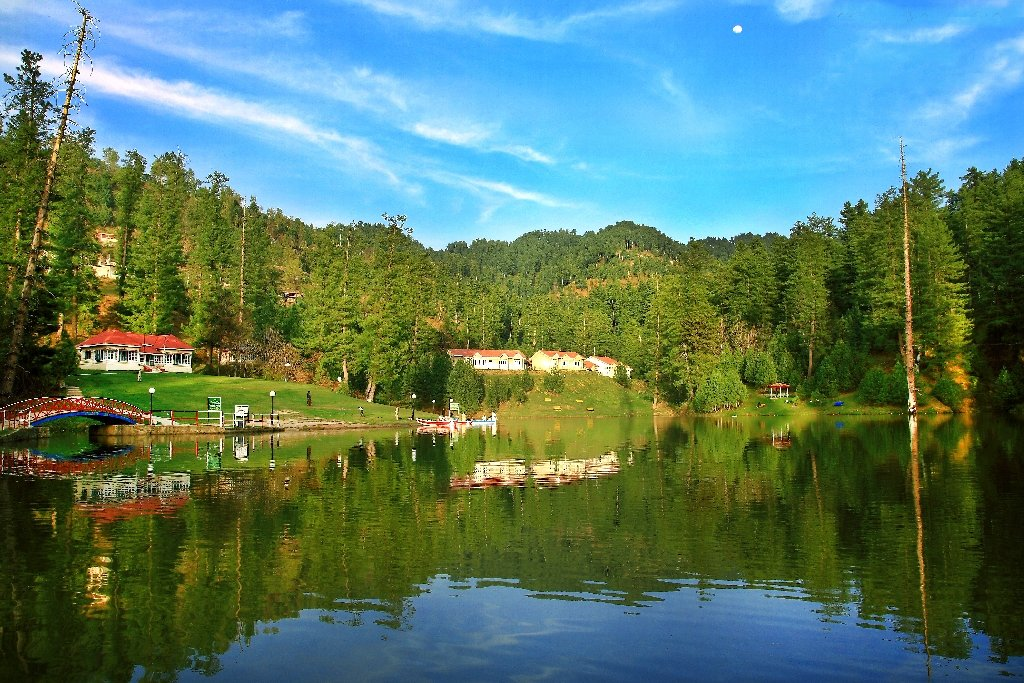
- Banjosa Lake

- Location within Azad Kashmir Location within Pakistan
- Location: Rawalakot, Poonch District, Azad Kashmir
- Coordinates: 33°48′38″N 73°48′59″E
- Type: Artificial lake
- Basin countries: Pakistan
- Surface elevation: 1,981 meters (6,499 ft)

Banjosa Lake (Urdu: بنجوسہ جھیل) is a man-made lake and a tourist resort 18 kilometers (11 mi) from the city of Rawalakot in Poonch District of Azad Kashmir, Pakistan. It is located at an altitude of 1,981 meters (6,499 ft). This lake is 160 kilometers away from Rawalpindi.

Banjosa Lake was rebuilt by Shoukat Hussain, a well-known contractor of Poonch District.

The lake, which is surrounded by dense pine forest and mountains, is accessible by a metalled road from Rawalakot.The lake freezes over in winter and people walk on it and also skate on its frozen surface.

== Climate ==
The weather in the area remains cool in the summer and cold in the winter. In December and January, snowfall also occurs here, and the temperature falls to −5 °C (23 °F). During summer, the temperature remains anywhere between 16 °C (61 °F) to 25 °C (77 °F).

== Accommodation ==
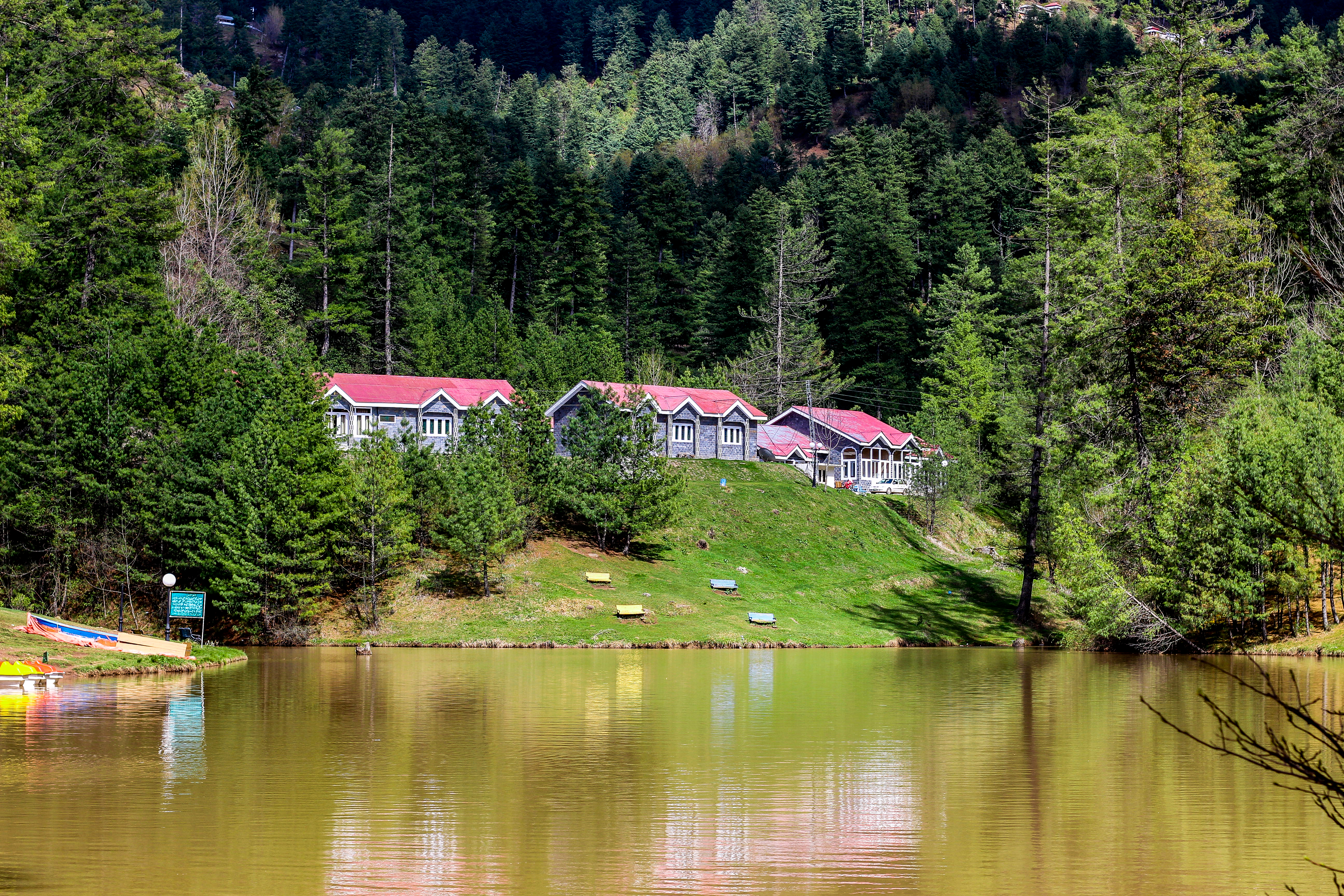
Resorts at Banjosa Lake

Some rest houses and huts of AJK Tourism and Archeology Department, Pakistan Public Works Department (PWD) and Pearl Development Authority are located here. A few hotels, guest houses and tuck shops also exist near the lake. A market is located 1 kilometer (0.62 mi) away in Chotta Gala Bazaar and Banjosa Bazaar. A few hotels and rest houses are also located in this town.

== See also ==
- Toli Pir
- Rawalakot
- List of lakes in Pakistan
