= Kundal Shahi =

- Village
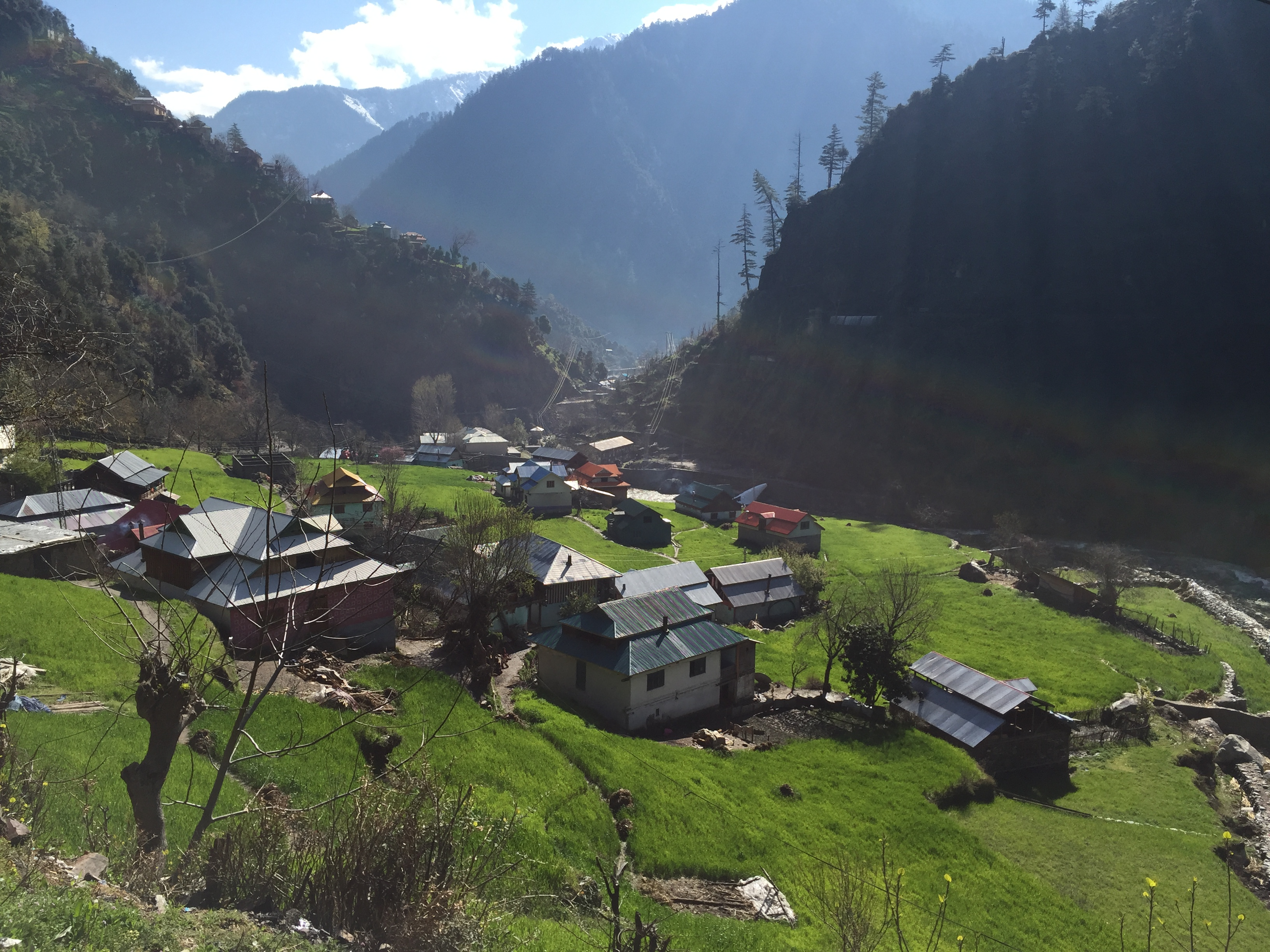
- Kundal Shahi Village, Kashmir

- Location within Azad Kashmir Location within Pakistan
- Coordinates: 34.5548°N 73.8439°E
- Country: Pakistan
- State: Azad Kashmir
- District: Neelam
- Elevation: 1,357 m (4,452 ft)

Languages
  - Official: Urdu
  - Spoken: Kundal Shahi, Hindko
- Time zone: UTC+05:00 (PST)

Kundal Shahi (Urdu: کنڈل شاہی; locally: kunḍal šai) is a village and tourist resort in the Neelum District in northern Azad Kashmir, Pakistan. It has a scattered settlement area, located on both sides of the Jagran Nallah River, at its confluence with the Neelum River. It is a few minutes walking distance from the Neelam Valley highway, some 74 km (46 mi) by road from Muzaffarabad, and a few kilometres away from the Line of Control between India– and Pakistan-administered Kashmir.

The majority of the population are of the Qureshi ethnic group, and there are small numbers of people from the Sheikh, Mughal, and Sayyid groups. Members of the Qureshi community, numbering about 3,000 people, speak the Kundal Shahi language. It is an endangered language as it is not being learned by the younger generation, who are shifting to Hindko, the language of wider communication in the area. Most of the people of the village follow the Barelvi school of Sunni Islam.

== Facilities and Services ==
Residents and tourists can find essential services in Kundal Shahi. One notable is the "9 to 11 Shop," which serves as a UBL Omni service point, offering the only available way for financial transactions in the area. The shop also provides printing and photocopying services, making it a vital spot for tourists needing these facilities during their visit.

== See also ==
- Athmuqam Tehsil
- Dosut
- Kutton
- Keran
- Sharda
- Kel
