= Sharada Peeth =

Ruined Kashmiri Hindu temple and ancient centre of learning

- 𑆯𑆳𑆫𑆢𑆳 𑆥𑆵𑆜
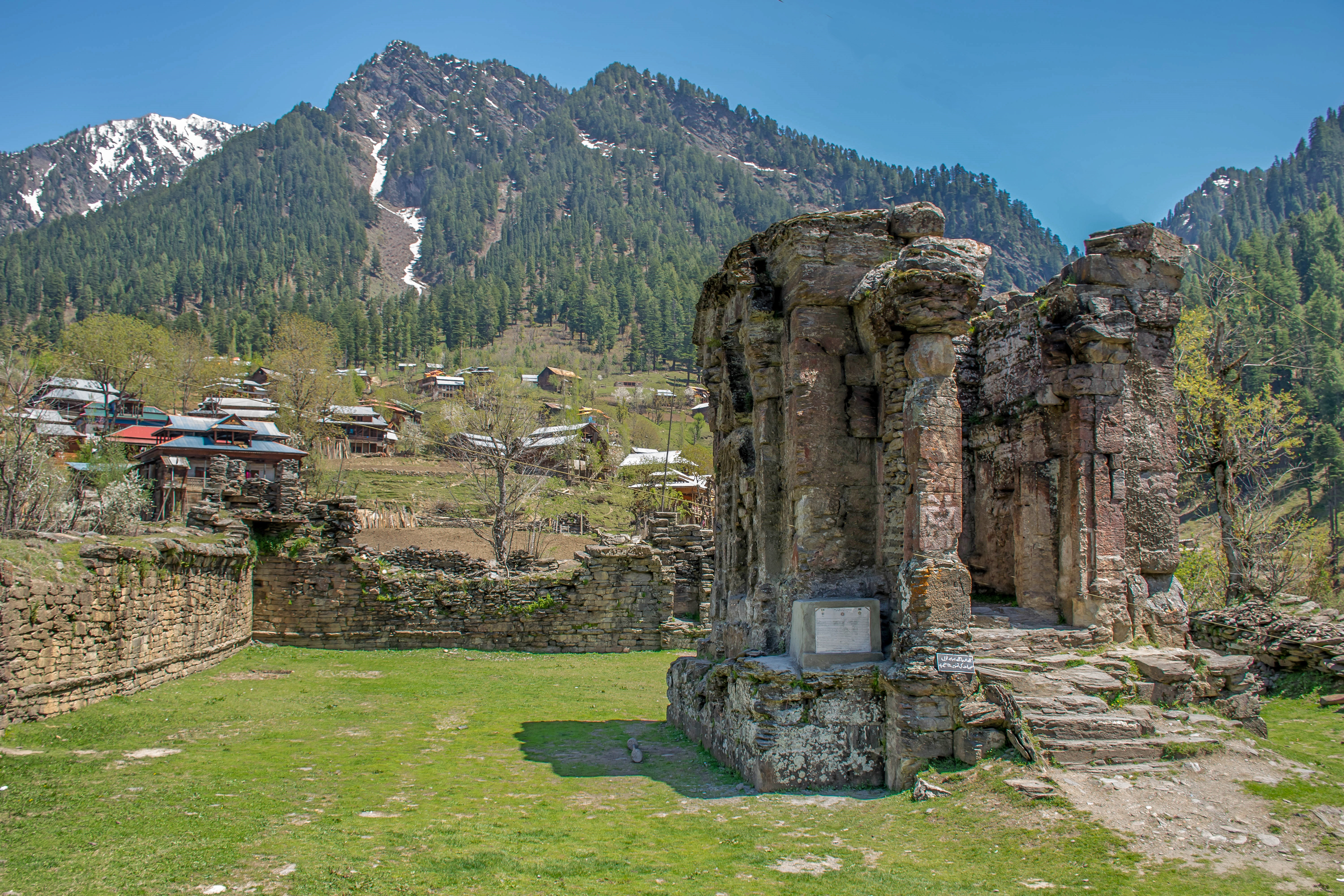
- Ruins of Sharada Peeth

- Location within Kashmir Location within Pakistan

Religion
- Affiliation: Hinduism
- District: Neelum Valley
- Region: Kashmir
- Deity: Sharada
- Rite: Shaktism, Shaivism, Vedism

Location
- Location: Sharda
- Country: Pakistan
- Territory: Azad Jammu and Kashmir (AJK)
- Coordinates: 34°47′31″N 74°11′24″E

Architecture
- Style: Kashmiri

Specifications
- Width: 22 ft (6.7 m)
- Height (max): 16 ft (4.9 m)
- Site area: 4 kanals (0.5 acre)

Sharada Peeth is a ruined Hindu temple and ancient centre of learning located in the Neelum Valley of Pakistan-administered Azad Jammu and Kashmir (AJK) in the disputed Kashmir region. Between the 6th and 12th centuries CE, it was among the most prominent temple universities in the South Asia. Known in particular for its library, stories recount scholars travelling long distances to access its texts. It played a key role in the development and popularisation of the Sharada script in North India, causing the script to be named after it, and Kashmir to acquire the moniker "Sharada Desh", meaning "country of Sharada".

As one of the Maha Shakta pithas, Hindus believe that it represents the spiritual location of the goddess Sati's fallen right hand. Sharada Peeth is one of the three holiest sites of pilgrimage for Kashmiri Pandits, alongside the Martand Sun Temple and the Amarnath Temple.

Sharada Peeth is located approximately 150 kilometres (93 mi) from Muzaffarabad, the capital of Azad Jammu and Kashmir (AJK). It is 10 kilometres (6.2 mi) away from the Line of Control, which divides the Pakistani- and Indian-controlled areas of the disputed Kashmir region. It is situated 1,981 metres (6,499 ft) above sea level, along the Neelum River in the village of Sharda, in the valley of Mount Harmukh, believed by Kashmiri Pandits to be the abode of Shiva.

== History and etymology ==
Sharada Peeth translates to "the seat of Sharada", the Kashmiri name for the Hindu goddess Saraswati.

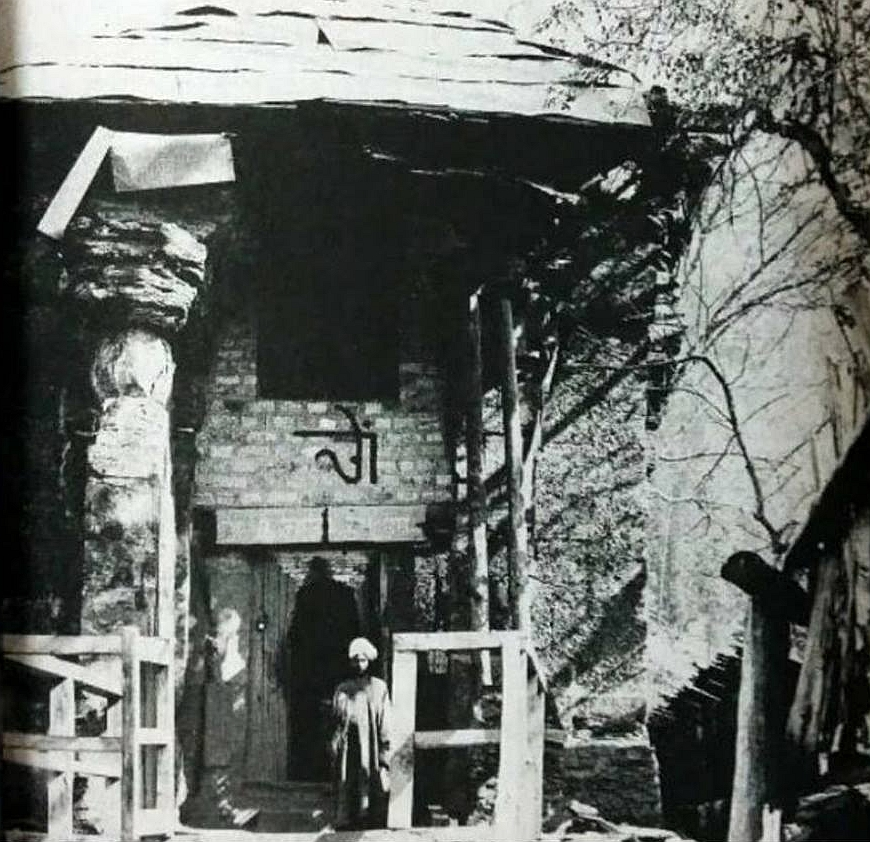
A photograph of Sharada Peeth in 1893 by the British archaeologist Aurel Stein with a Kashmiri Pandit standing at the entrance

The beginnings of Sharada Peeth are uncertain, and the question of origins difficult, because Sharada Peeth might have been both a temple and an educational institution. It was probably commissioned by Lalitaditya Muktapida (r. 724 CE–760 CE) though no definitive evidence exists in favor. Al-Biruni recorded the place for the first time, as a revered shrine housing a wooden image of Sharda — however, he had never ventured into Kashmir and based his observations on hearsay.

=== As a centre of learning ===
Sharada Peeth is referred to by various historians, detailing its mythological status and prominence in ancient India. Its historical development is traced through references made to it by various historical sources. The Sharada script was used extensively in Sharada Peeth, and acquired its name from the institution.

=== As a temple ===
By the 8th century, the temple was a site of pilgrimage, attracting devotees from as far as present-day Bengal. By the 11th century, it was among the most revered places of worship in the South Asia, described in Al-Biruni's chronicle of India. Significantly, it featured not in his description of Kashmir, but in his list of the most famous Hindu temples in the South Asia, alongside the Multan Sun Temple, the Sthaneshwar Mahadev Temple, and the Somnath temple.

Jonaraja describes a visit by the Kashmiri Muslim sultan Zain-ul-Abidin in 1422 CE. The sultan visited the temple seeking a vision of the goddess, but grew angry with her because she did not appear to him in person. In frustration, he slept in the court of the temple, where she appeared to him in a dream. In the 16th century, Abu'l-Fazl ibn Mubarak, Grand vizier to the Mughal emperor Akbar, described Sharada Peeth as a "stone temple ... regarded with great veneration". He also described the popular belief in miracles at the shrine: "it is believed that on every eighth tithe of the bright half of the month, it begins to shake and produces the most extraordinary effect".

=== Legendary origins ===
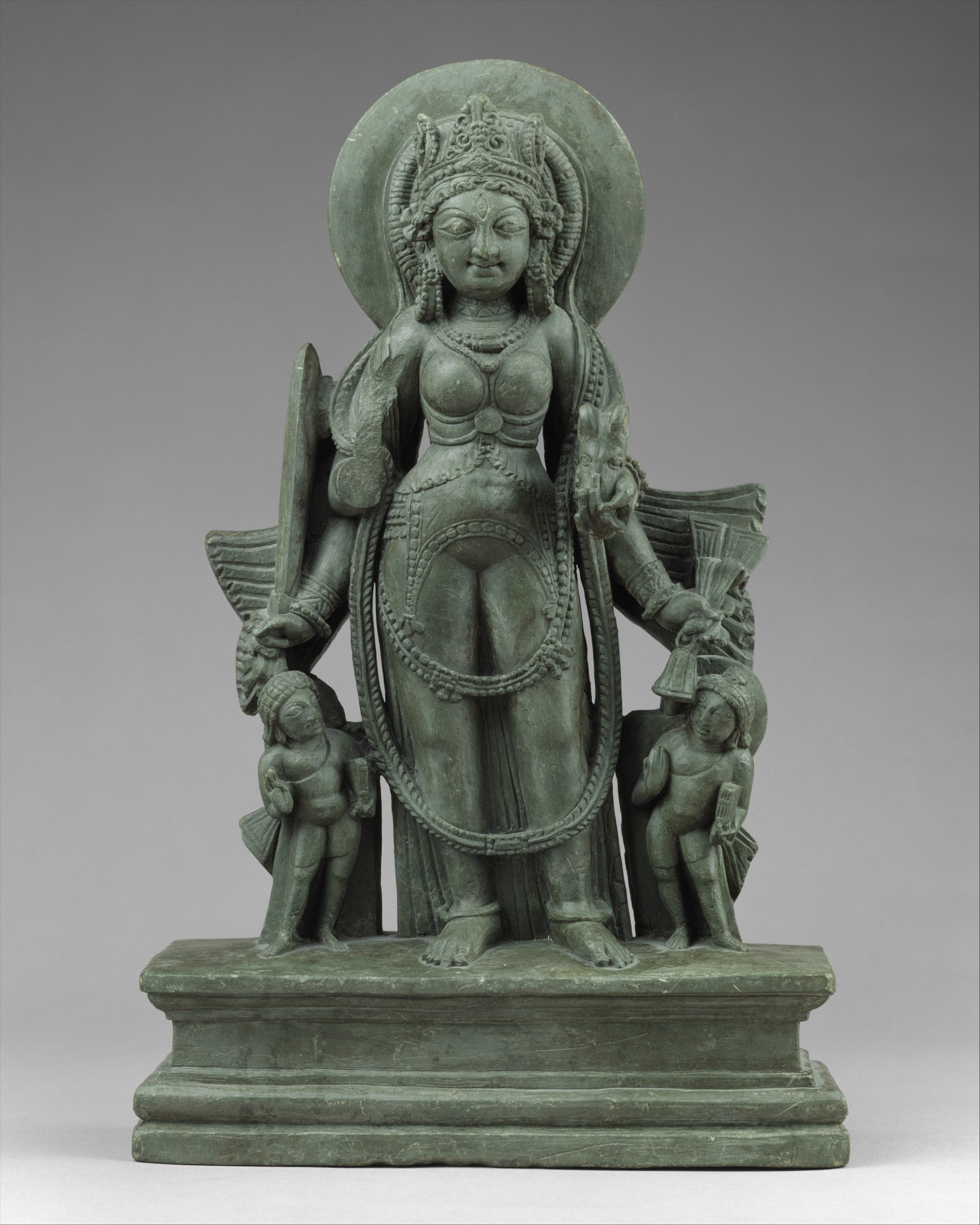
Four-armed statue of the goddess Sharada from Kashmir, c. late 9th century AD

==== Legends ====
An alternative account holds that Shandilya prayed to the goddess Sharada with great devotion, and was rewarded when she appeared to him and promised to show him her real, divine form. She advised him to look for the Sharada forest, and his journey was filled with miraculous experiences. On his way, he had a vision of the god Ganesha on the eastern side of a hill. When he reached the Neelum river, he bathed in it and saw half his body turn golden. Eventually, the goddess revealed herself to him in her triple form of Sharada, Saraswati and Vagdevi, and invited him to her abode. As he was preparing for a ritual, he drew water from the Mahāsindhu. Half of this water transformed into honey, and became a stream, now known as the Madhumati stream.

== Literary and cultural references ==
Sharada Peeth has appeared in various historical and literary texts. Its earliest mention is in the Nilamata Purana (6th – 8th century CE). The 11th-century Kashmiri poet Bilhana describes both the spiritual and academic elements of Sharada Peeth. He describes Kashmir as a patron of learning and Sharada Peeth as the source of that reputation. He also says that the goddess Sharada:

"resemble[s] a swan, carrying as her diadem the [glittering gold washed from the sand] of the Madhumati stream, which is bent on rivaling Ganga. Spreading luster by her fame as her diadem, and rivaling the Ganges river. Spreading luster by her fame, brilliant like crystal, she makes even Mount Himalaya, the preceptor of Gauri, raise higher his head (referring to his peaks) [in pride] of her residence there."

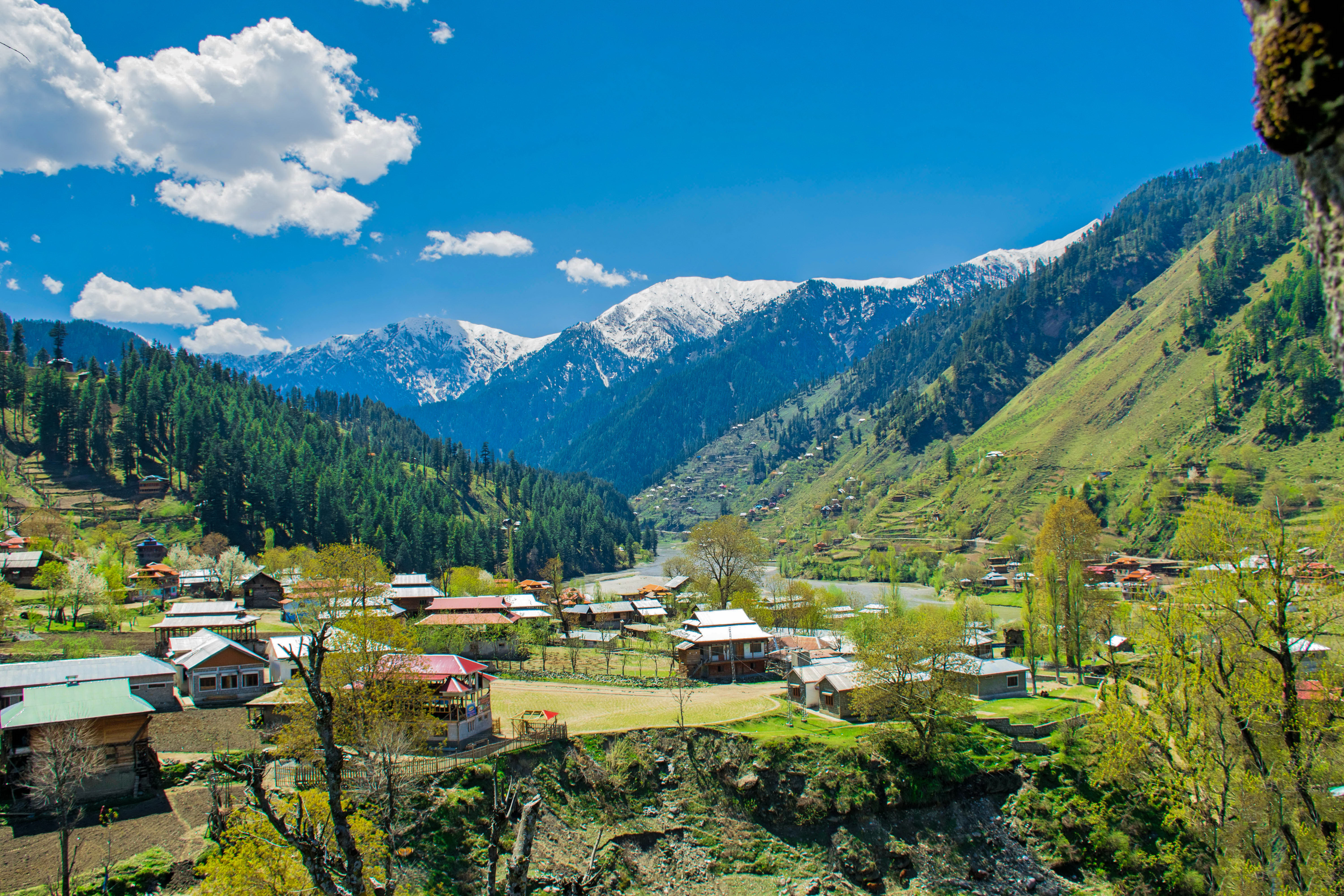
View of the Neelum Valley from Sharada Peeth

In Kalhana's 12th century epic, Rajatarangini, Sharada Peeth is identified as a site of popular veneration:

35. There, the goddess Saraswati herself is seen in the form of a swan in a lake [situated] on the summit of the Bheda hill, which is sanctified by the Ganga source.
37. There, when visiting the goddess Sharada, one reaches once the river Madhumati, and [the river of] Saraswati worshipped by poets.

Kalhana points out other events of political significance involving Sharada Peeth. During Lalitaditya's reign (713 – 755), a group of assassins from the Gauda Kingdom entered Kashmir under the guise of a pilgrimage to Sharada Peeth. Kalhana also describes a rebellion during his own lifetime. Three princes, Lothana, Vigraharaja, and Bhoja, rebelled against King Jayasimha of Kashmir. These princes, pursued by the Royal Army, sought refuge in the upper Kishanganga Valley, in the Sirahsila Castle. Kalhana believed that the Royal Army took refuge in Sharada Peeth, because it had the open space required for a temporary military village, and because the area surrounding the Sirahsila Castle was not large enough to host a camp for a siege without the siege force being vulnerable to archers.

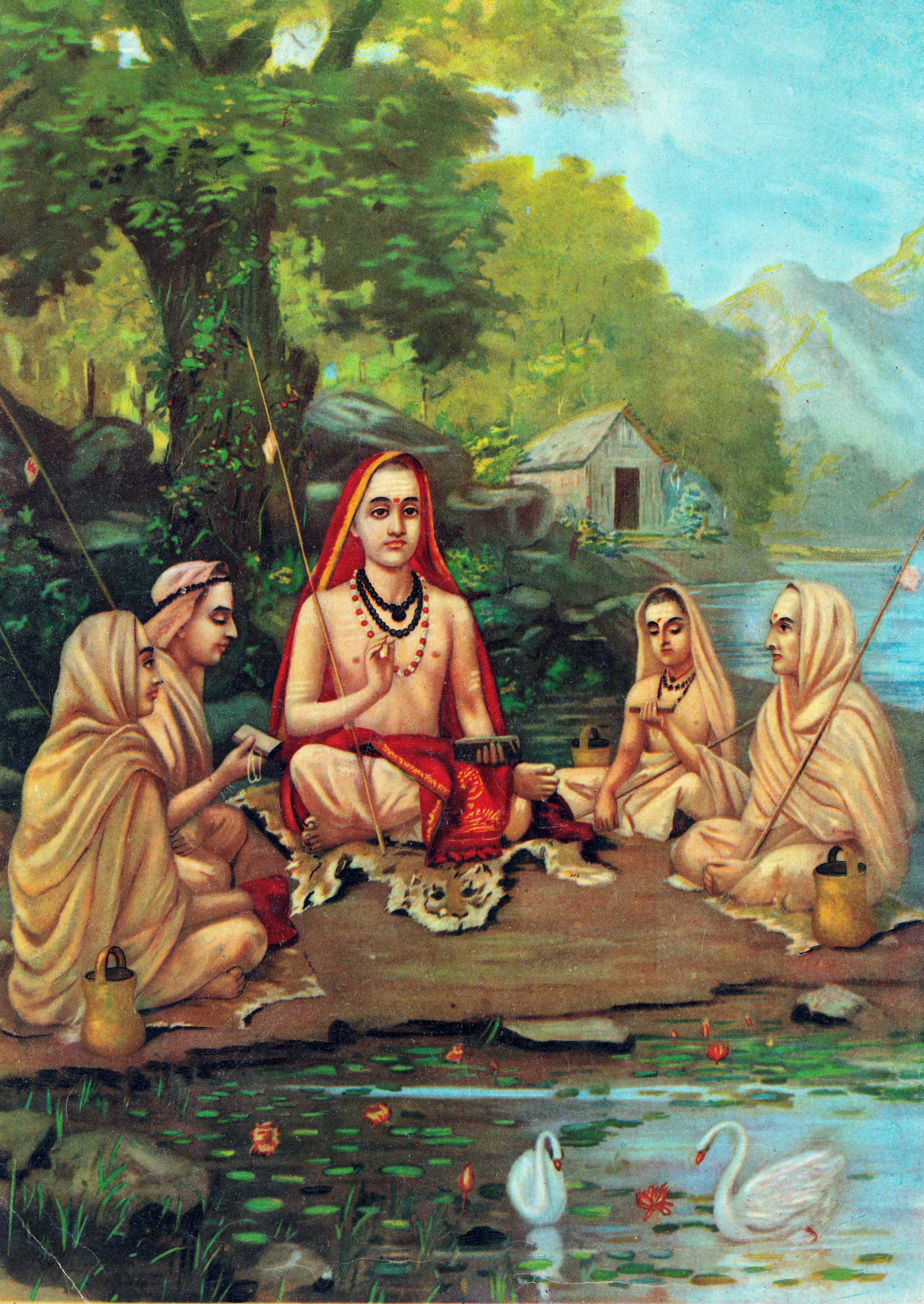
Adi Shankara is believed to have opened Sharada Peeth's south door

In the 14th century text Madhaviya Shankara Vijayam, there is a test, unique to Sharada Peeth, known as the Sarvajna Peetham, or Throne of Omniscience. These were four thrones, each representing an entrance of the temple corresponding to one of the points of the compass, which only a learned man from that direction could symbolically open. Adi Shankara, being from South India, took it upon himself to pass this challenge, because although the other doors had been opened, no one from the south of Kashmir had yet been successful. He was said to be welcomed by the common people, but challenged by the scholars of the region. As he approached the southern door, he was stopped by various learned men from the Nyaya school of philosophy, Buddhists, Svetambar Jains, and the followers of Jaimini. Engaging with them, he managed to persuade all of them of his proficiency in philosophy, and they stood aside to let him open the entrance. Finally, as he was about to ascend the throne, he heard the voice of the goddess Sharada challenging him. The voice said that omniscience was not enough if one was impure, and that Shankara, who lived in the palace of King Amaruka, could not be pure. Shankara replied that his body had never committed a sin, and the sins committed by another could not blemish him. The goddess Sharada accepted his explanation and permitted him to ascend.

In the Carnatic music song Kalavathi kamalasana yuvathi, the 19th-century composer Muthuswami Dikshitar refers to Sharada Peeth as Saraswati's abode. Set in the raga yagapriya, the song praises Saraswati:

Kāśmīra vihāra, vara śāradā.
The one who resides in Kashmir, Sharada.

Today, Sharada Peeth continues to figure in South Indian Brahmin traditions. At the beginning of formal education, some sects of Brahmins ritually prostrate in the direction of Sharada Peeth. Saraswat Brahmin communities in Karnataka are also said to perform a ritual of moving seven steps towards Kashmir before retracing their steps during the Yagnopavit ceremony and include the Sharada stotram in their morning prayers.

Namaste Sarada Devi Kashmira mandala vasini.
I bow to the Goddess Sharada, who lives in Kashmir.

== Religious significance ==
=== Importance to Kashmiri Pandits ===
The Sharada temple has played a significant historical role in Kashmiri Pandit religious culture. It is believed to be the earliest shrine dedicated to Shaktism, or Hindu goddess worship in Kashmir, with later shrines including the Kheer Bhawani and Vaishno Devi temples. It also advanced the importance of knowledge and education in Kashmiri Pandit culture, which persisted well after Kashmiri Pandits became a minority group in Kashmir. Kashmiri Pandits believe that the goddess Sharada worshipped in Sharada Peeth is a tripartite embodiment of the goddess Shakti: Sharada (goddess of learning), Saraswati (goddess of knowledge), and Vagdevi (goddess of speech, which articulates power). In line with the Kashmiri Pandit belief that springs which are the abode of goddesses should not be looked at directly, the shrine contains a stone slab concealing the spring underneath, which they believe to be the spring in which the goddess Sharada revealed herself to Sandilya.

During Mughal and Afghan rule, Neelum Valley was ruled by Muslim chiefs of the Bomba tribe, and the pilgrimage decreased in importance. It regained its stead during Dogra rule, when Maharaja Gulab Singh repaired the temple and dedicated a monthly stipend to the Gautheng Brahmans who claimed the hereditary guardianship of the temple. Since then, a thriving Kashmiri Pandit community lived in the vicinity of the Sharada Peeth teerth (or pilgrimage). These included priests and traders, as well as saints and their disciples. As a religious ritual, Kashmiri Pandit theologians across Kashmir would place their manuscripts in covered platters before idols of the goddess Sharada, to obtain her blessings. They believed that the goddess would convey approval of the pages of writings by leaving them undisturbed, and disapproval by leaving the pages ruffled. In addition, an annual fair would be held at Shardi village, with pilgrims travelling through Kupwara (in Kashmir), in worship of the goddess Sharada. Kashmiri Pandits believe that the Sharada pilgrimage parallels Shandilya's journey, and that the act of bathing in the confluence of the Neelum River and Madhumati stream cleanses the pilgrim of their sins. In 1947, the Kashmiri saint Swami Nand Lal Ji moved some of the stone idols to Tikker in Kupwara. Some of those were subsequently moved to Devibal in Baramulla. The temple fell into disuse following the India–Pakistan war of 1947–1948, which split the princely state of Kashmir into the Pakistani-administered territory of Azad Jammu and Kashmir(AJK), and Indian-administered territory of Jammu and Kashmir. This caused large numbers of Kashmiri Pandits to migrate out of Shardi to Indian administered Jammu and Kashmir. Since then, Kashmiri Pandits unable to visit the shrine have created "substitutes" for the pilgrimage in places like Srinagar, Bandipore, and Gush in Jammu and Kashmir.

== Post-Partition Of British India ==
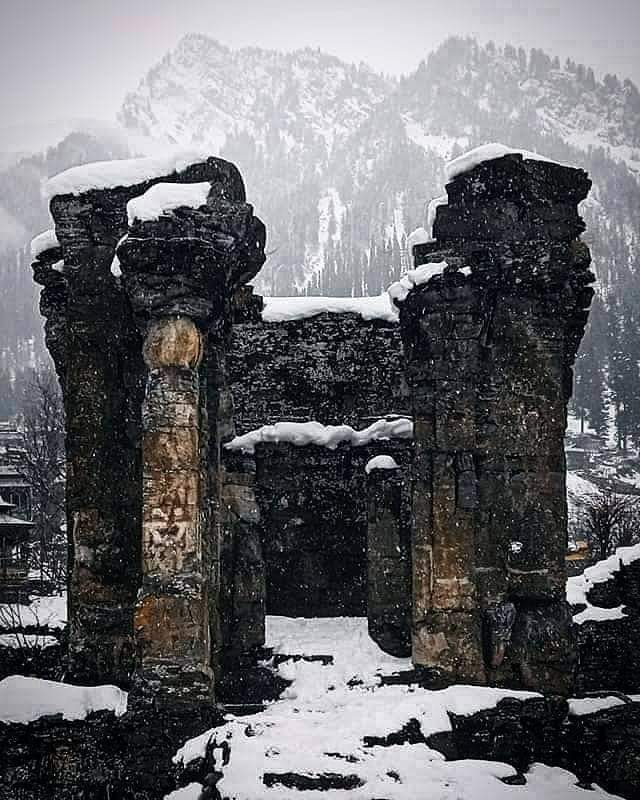
Sharada temple under snow

Religious tourism to Sharada Peeth has declined considerably since the India–Pakistan war of 1947–1948, which resulted in the division of Kashmir between India and Pakistan following the Karachi Agreement; most Kashmiri Pandits remained on the Indian side of the Line of Control, and travel restrictions have discouraged Indian Hindus from visiting the shrine. No Objection Certificates are required for Indians seeking to visit. Furthermore, the temple's close proximity to the Line of Control discourages tourism from within Pakistan as well. Tourists to the Neelum district often overlook the ruins of the shrine, instead spending time in the scenic valley surrounding it. In 2007, a group of Kashmiri Pandits who were permitted to visit Azad Jammu and Kashmir(AJK) were denied permission to visit the temple. In September 2009, the Institute of Peace and Conflict Studies recommended increased cross-border religious tourism between India and Pakistan, including allowing Kashmiri Pandits to visit Sharada Peeth, and Pakistani Muslims to visit the Hazratbal Shrine in Srinagar.

The shrine remains politically significant, with Kashmiri Pandit organisations and leaders from Jammu and Kashmir urging the governments of India and Pakistan to facilitate cross-border pilgrimages. Senior Indian politicians have also called on Pakistan to renovate the temple, and it is discussed bilaterally as part of the Composite Dialogue between the governments of India and Pakistan. In 2019, Pakistan government opened the Kartarpur Corridor to allow Sikh pilgrims in India to visit the Gurdwara Darbar Sahib Kartarpur across the border. This strengthened calls by Kashmiri Pandits to the Pakistani government to open a corridor to the Sharada Peeth site. In March 2019, Pakistani media reported that Pakistan had approved a plan for a Kartarpur-style corridor for Sharada Peeth. However, the Pakistani government has since said that a decision has not been made. In March 2023, Indian Home Minister Amit Shah stated that the government will forward towards opening a Kartarpur styled corridor for the temple. On 22 March 2023, Union Home Minister Amit Shah e-inaugurated the Sharda Devi temple in Teetwal, Karnah in Kupwara district, which is close to Line of Control. Sharada Peeth is situated barely 40 kilometers from Teetwal.

== Architecture ==
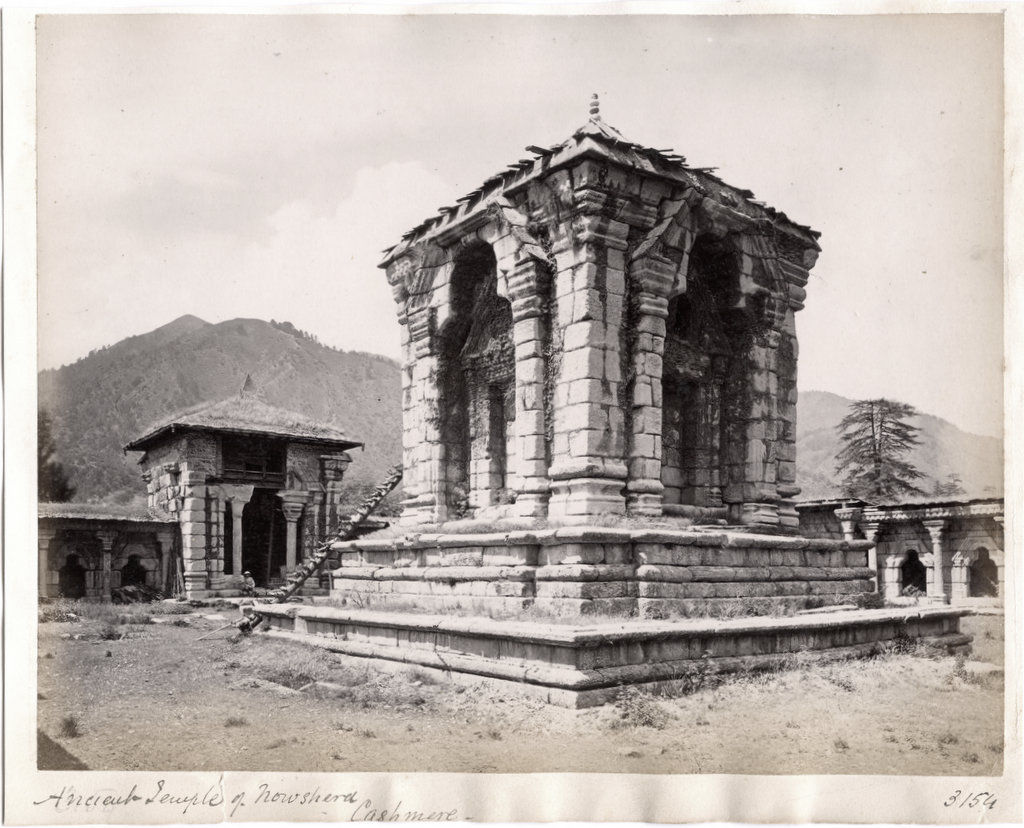
Architecturally similar temple at Boniyar, near Uri, Jammu and Kashmir in the 1870s

The temple is built in the Kashmiri architectural style using red sandstone. Historical records of the temple's architecture are scarce. A late 19th-century account by the British archaeologist Aurel Stein describes the temple's walls as intact to a height of approximately 20 feet (6.1 m), and its pillars rising approximately 16 feet (4.9 m).

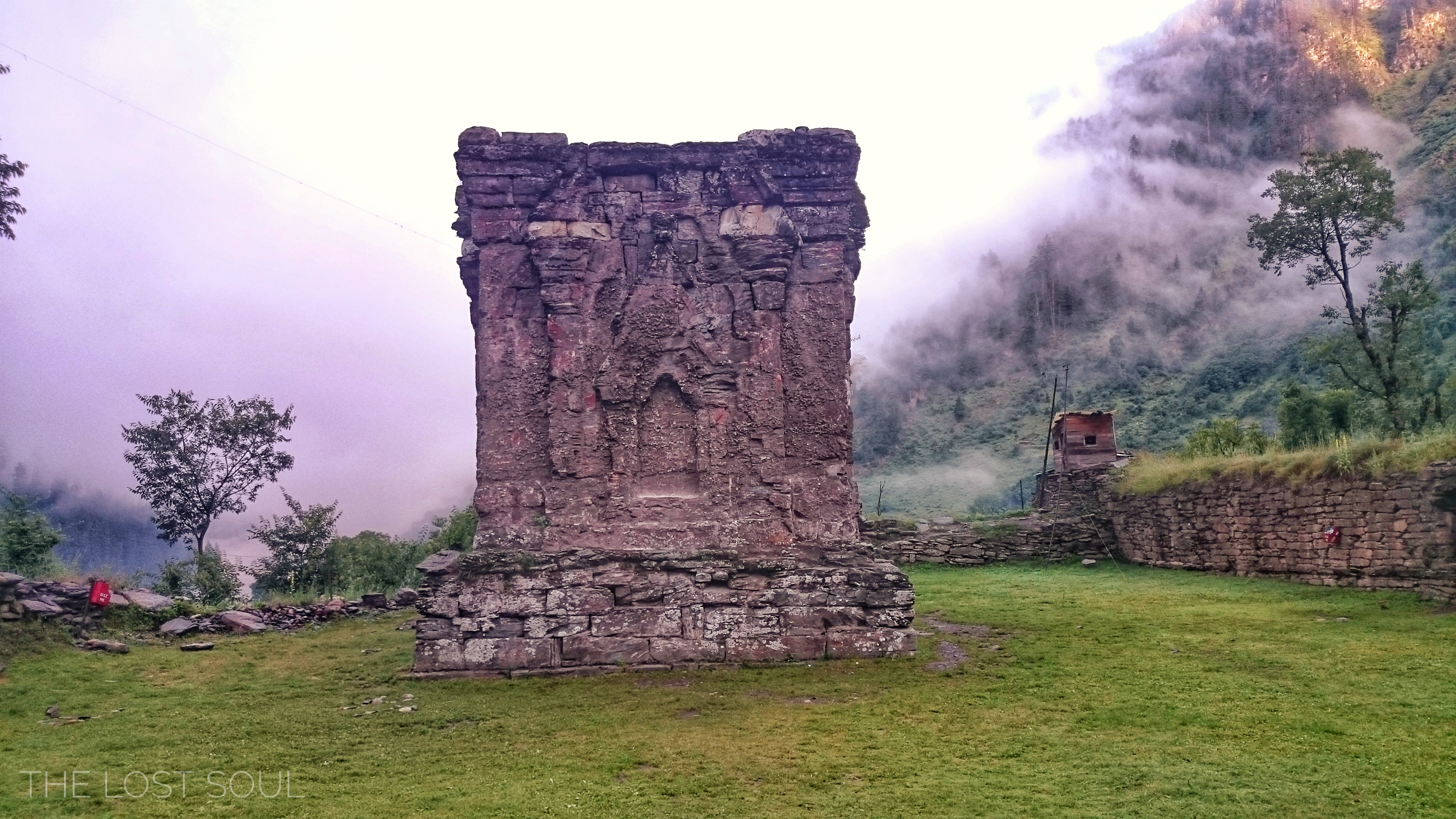
Sharada Peeth cella from behind

The compound is situated on a hill, approached on its west side through an imposing stone staircase. The facades are repetitive. Suggested reasons for this include that architects disliked plain outside walls, or that even if the spire collapsed, a visitor would be able to tell what the temple originally looked like. The design of the temple is simple, with a plain conical Sharada spire. It sits on a raised plinth, 24 square feet (2.2 m^{2}) in area and 5.25 feet (1.60 m) in height. The walls of the cella recede 2 feet (0.61 m) from the edge of the plinth. The temple is surrounded by a quadrangle which measures 142 feet (43 m) by 94 feet (29 m). The quadrangle is enclosed by walls of 11 feet (3.4 m) in height and 6 feet (1.8 m) in width. On the north, east, and south, the walls of the cella are adorned by trefoil arches and supporting pilasters, which are constructed in high relief. Below these are small, trefoil-headed niches covered by double pediments. Although a pyramidal stone roof is more typical to Kashmiri architecture, in Stein's description, the temple is covered by a low shingle roof. By the 21st century, the roof is no longer present and the interior of the temple is exposed to the elements. The temple appears imposing even from outside the walled enclosure, because of the plinths it is raised on to equalise the uneven elevations of the ground. The north side of the wall contained a small recess, in which two ancient linga could be seen.

The interior of the cella is plain, and forms a square of 12.25 feet (3.73 m) on each side. It houses a large slab of stone measuring 6 feet (1.8 m) by 7 feet (2.1 m). This slab covers the holy spring where the goddess Sharada is believed to have appeared to Rishi Shandilya. In the 19th century, this sacred spot was surmounted by a red cloth canopy and tinsel. The remainder of the interior was filled with ornaments of worship such as conches and bells.

== Associated figures ==
- In the 11th century, the Vaishnava saint Swami Ramanuja traveled from Srirangam to Sharada Peeth to refer to the Brahma Sutras, before commencing work on writing his commentary on the Brahma sutras, the Sri Bhasya.

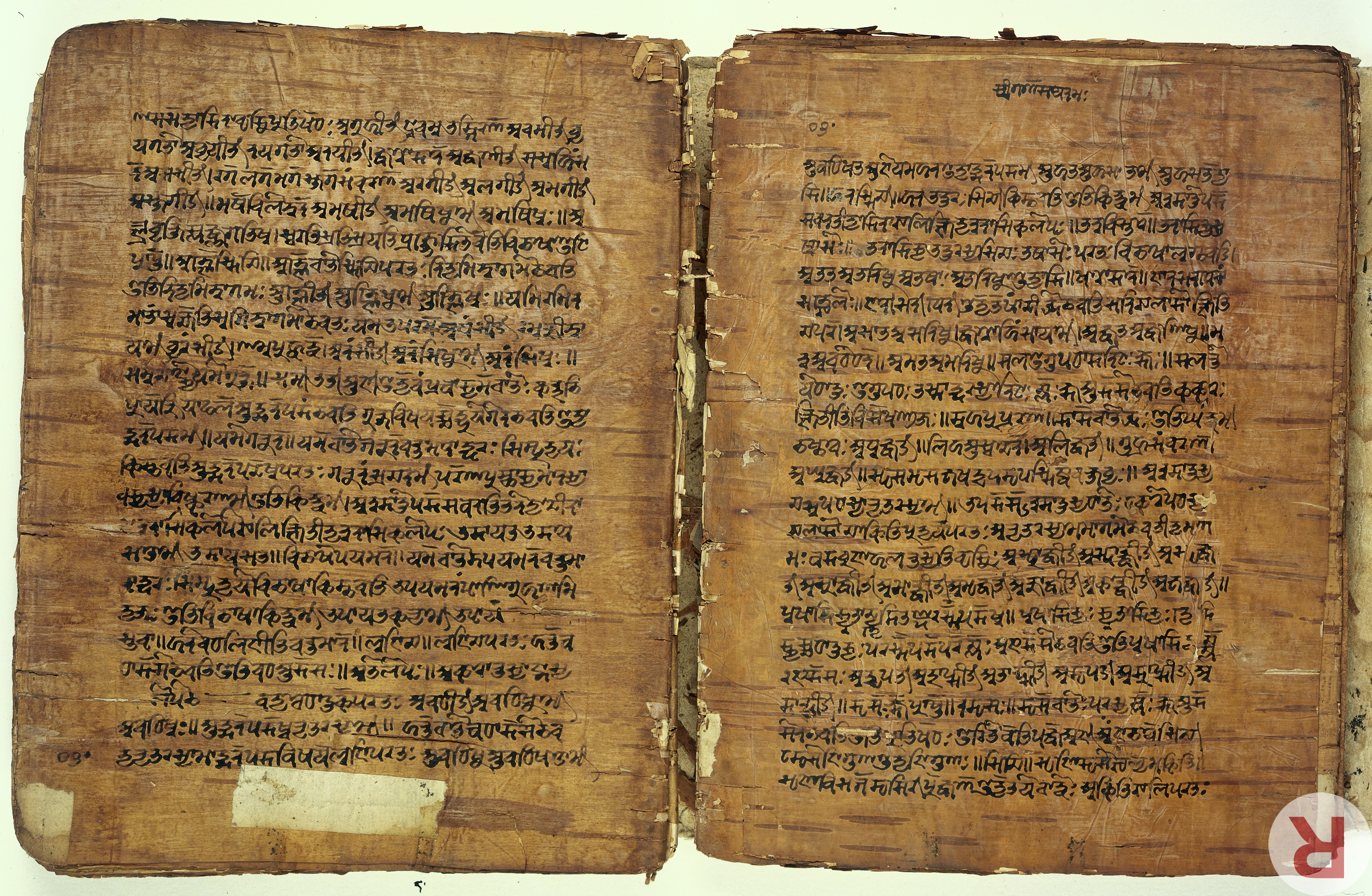
17th-century birch bark manuscript of Pāṇini's grammar treatise from Sharada Peeth

- Vaṭeśvara, a tenth century mathematician who presented several trigonometric identities. He was the author of Vaṭeśvara-siddhānta written in 904 AD, a treatise focusing on astronomy and applied mathematics.
- Utpaladeva (c. 900–950 CE) was an philosopher and theologian from Kashmir. He belonged to the Trika Shaiva tradition and is the most important thinker of the Pratyabhijñā school of monistic idealism
- The Kashmiri Hindu historian Kalhana Pandit
- Hindu philosopher Adi Shankara.

== See also ==
- Śāradā script
- University of Ancient Taxila
- Maa Sharda Devi temple, Teetwal, Karnah, Kupwara, India
- Shandilya Ashram
