= Dosut =

Village in Neelum Valley, Azad Kashmir

Dosut دوسٹ
- Village
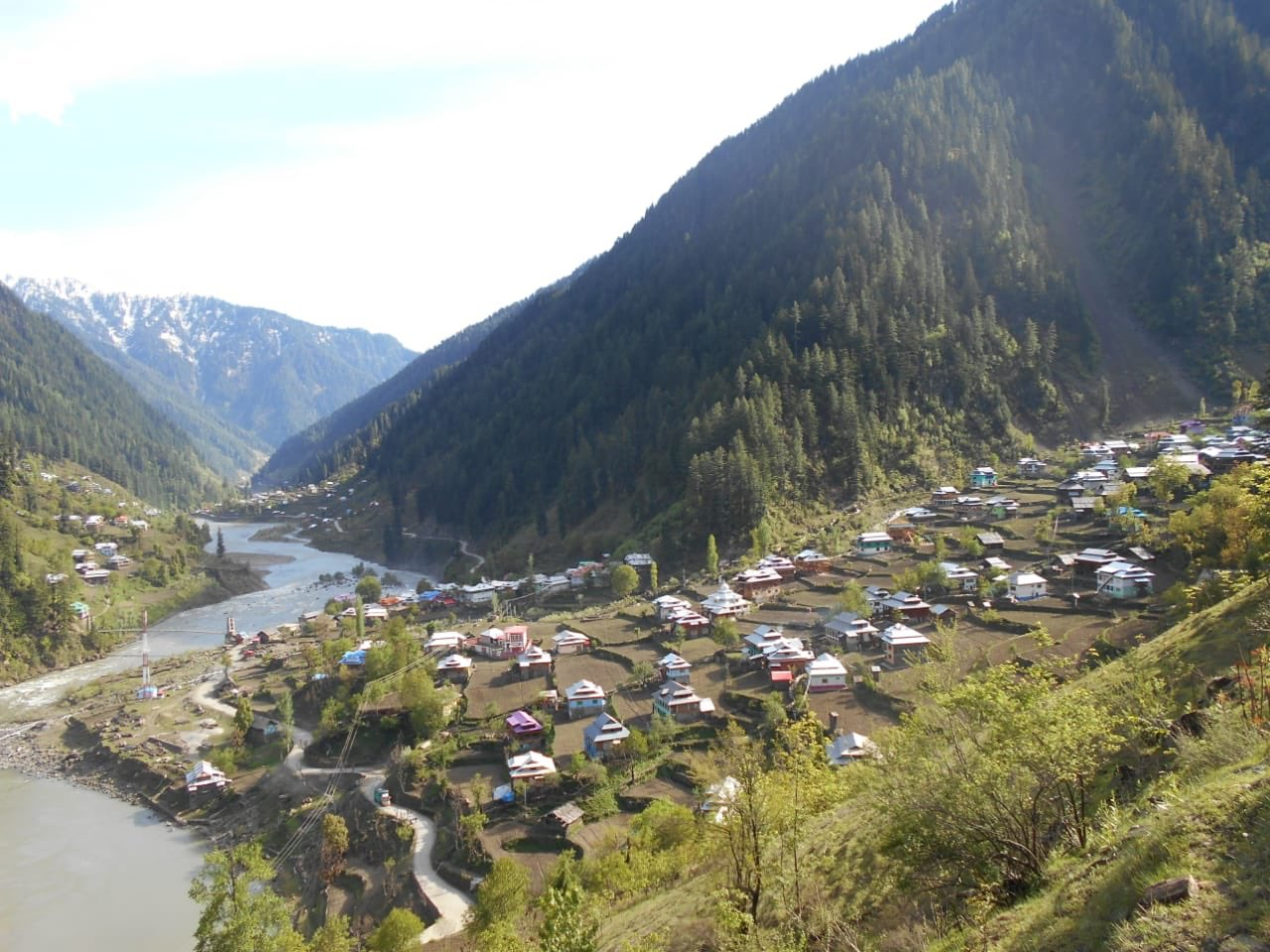
- View of Dosut

- Location within Azad Kashmir Location within Pakistan
- Coordinates: 34.7568°N 74.1373°E
- Country: Pakistan
- Territory: Azad Kashmir
- District: Neelum Valley
- Elevation: 2,100 m (6,900 ft)

Languages
  - Majority: Kashmiri
  - Other Languages: Urdu, Hindko
- Time zone: PST
- Website: www.ajktourism.gov.pk

Dosut (Urdu: دوسٹ, Kashmiri: دُسَٹھ) is a village in the Neelum Valley of Azad Kashmir, Pakistan. It is located 142 km from Muzaffarabad, and 6 km from Sharda.

== Divisions ==
Dosut is divided into small settlements. These settlements include Naka, Naka no 2, Molvi Shah Seri, Chan Basti, Khawaja Basti, Konsh and Malik Basti.

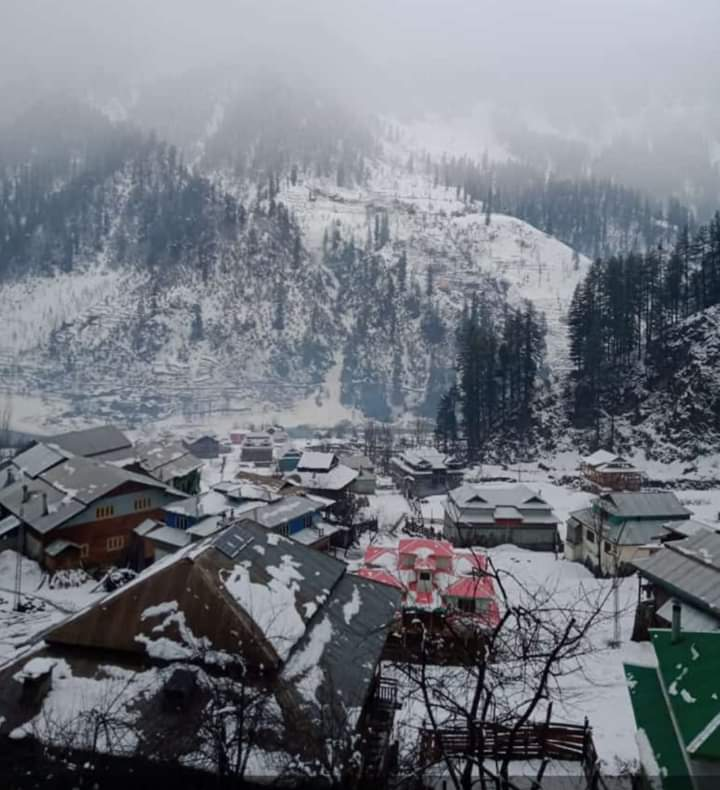
Beautiful Winter

== Languages and people ==
The languages spoken here are Kashmiri and Hindko. Urdu is used as secondary language (lingua franca).

Most of the people are engaged in agriculture while others are engaged in government employment and business. Usually, the crop which is growing here is corn.

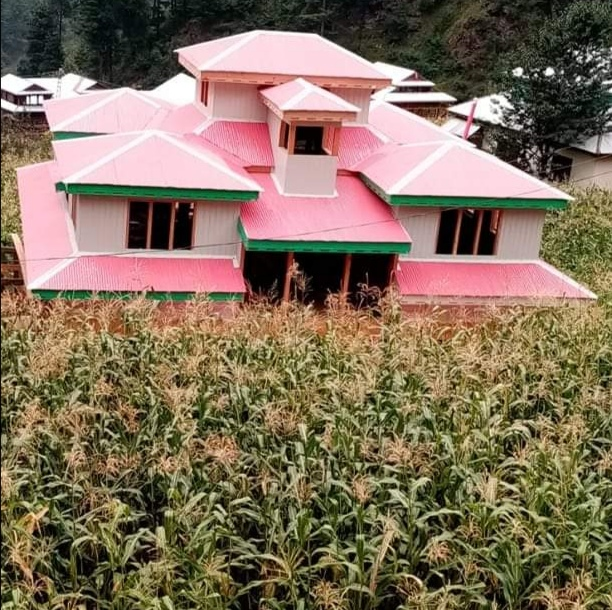
Maize Field in Dosut

== Gallery ==
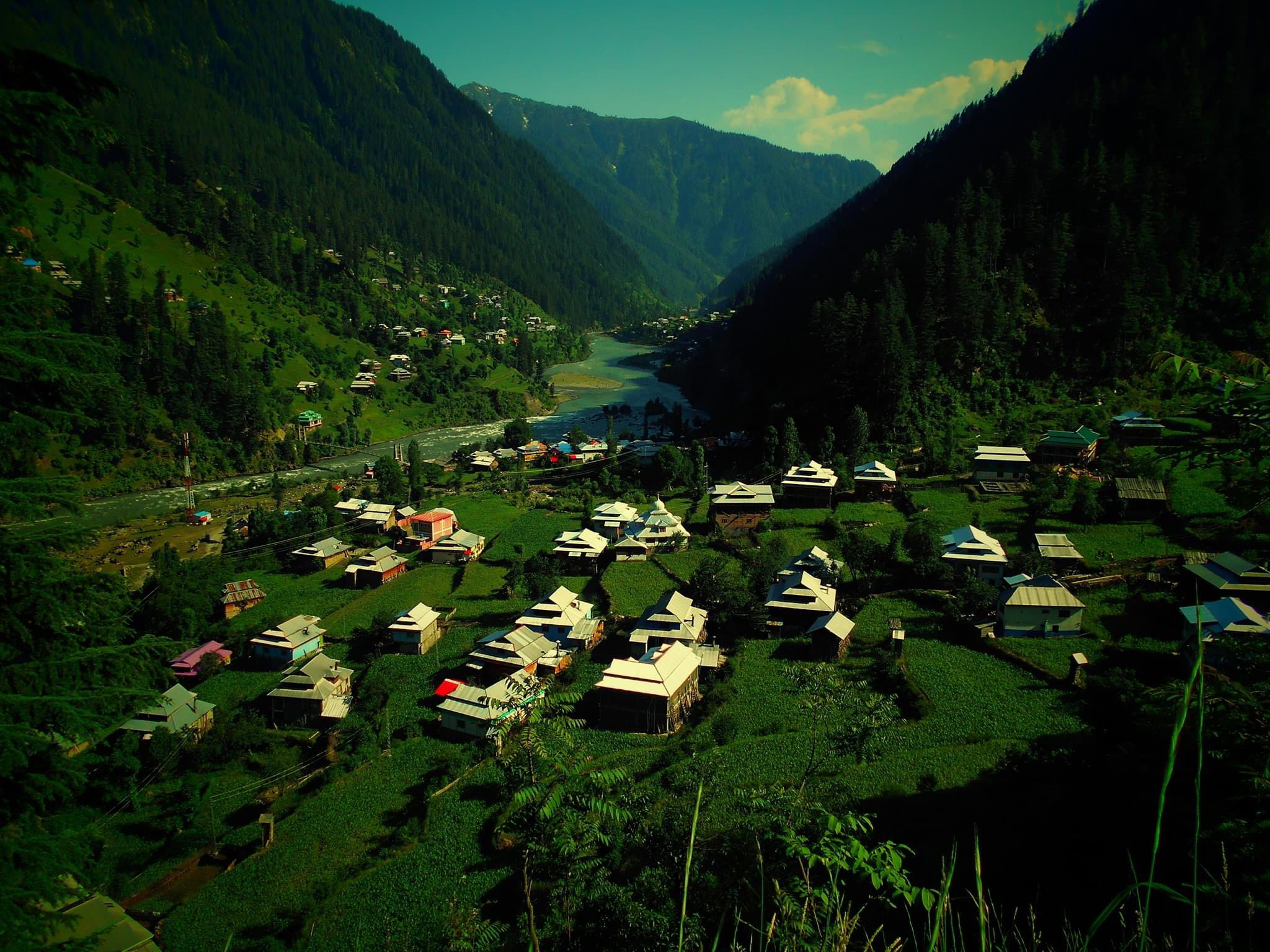
Cool Evening

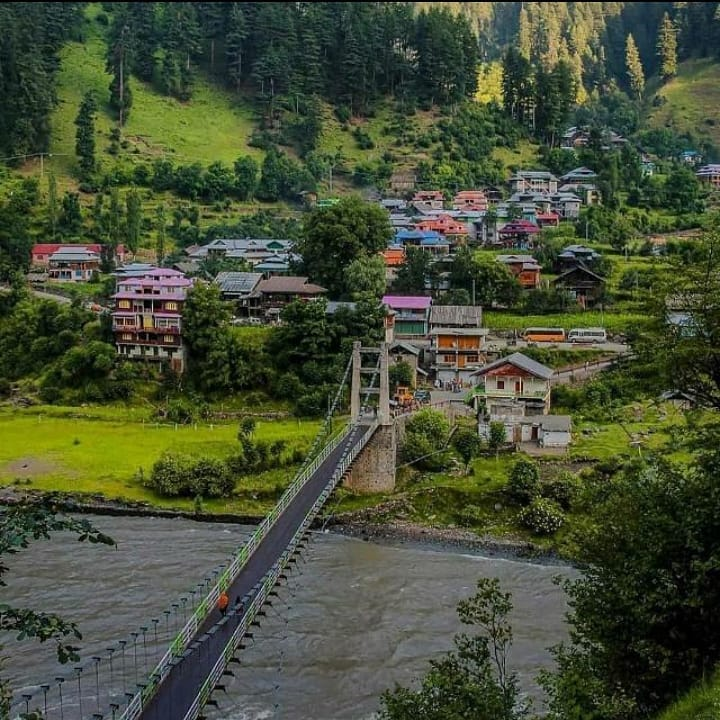
Greenery

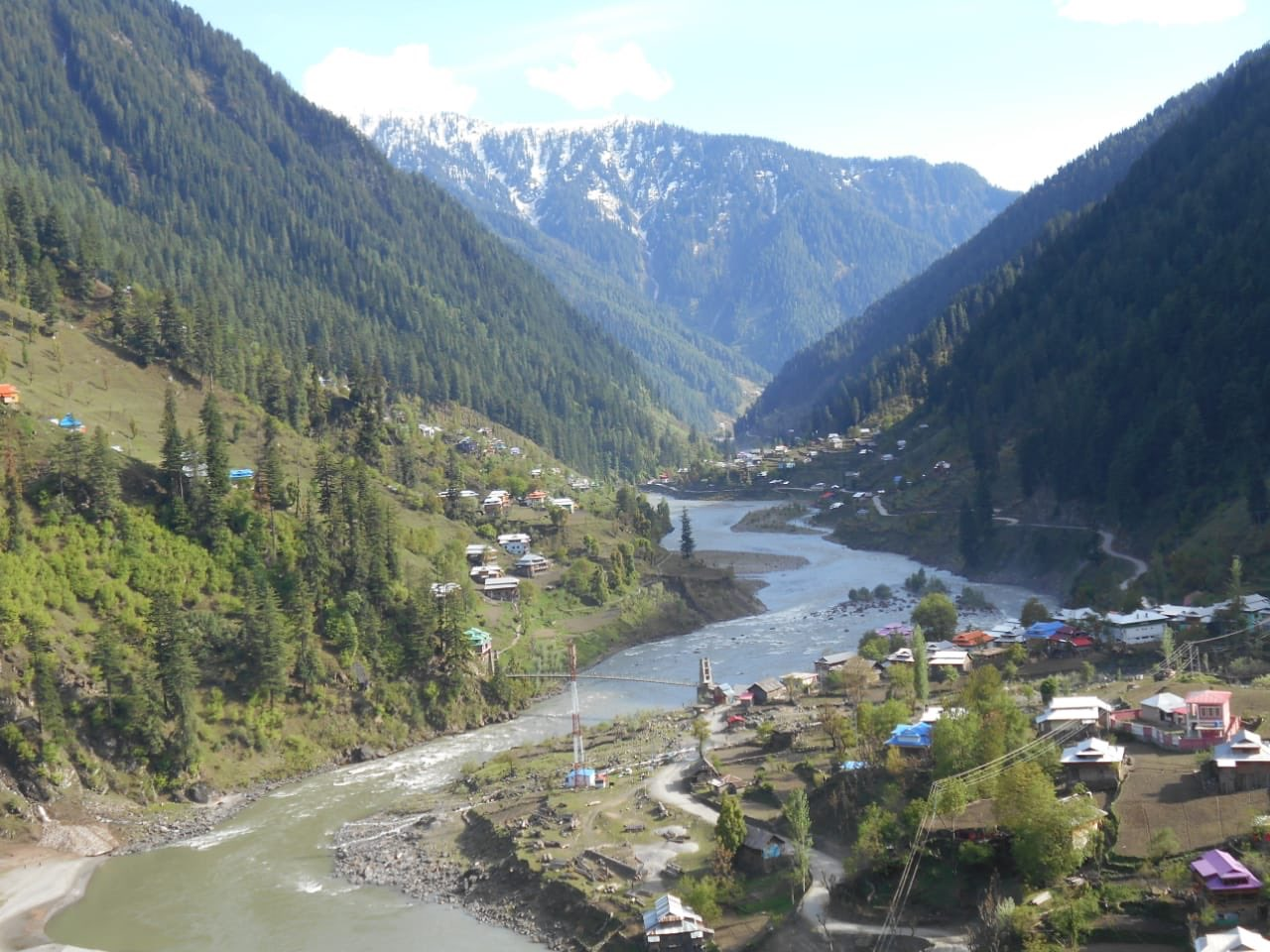
Neelum River passing from Dosut

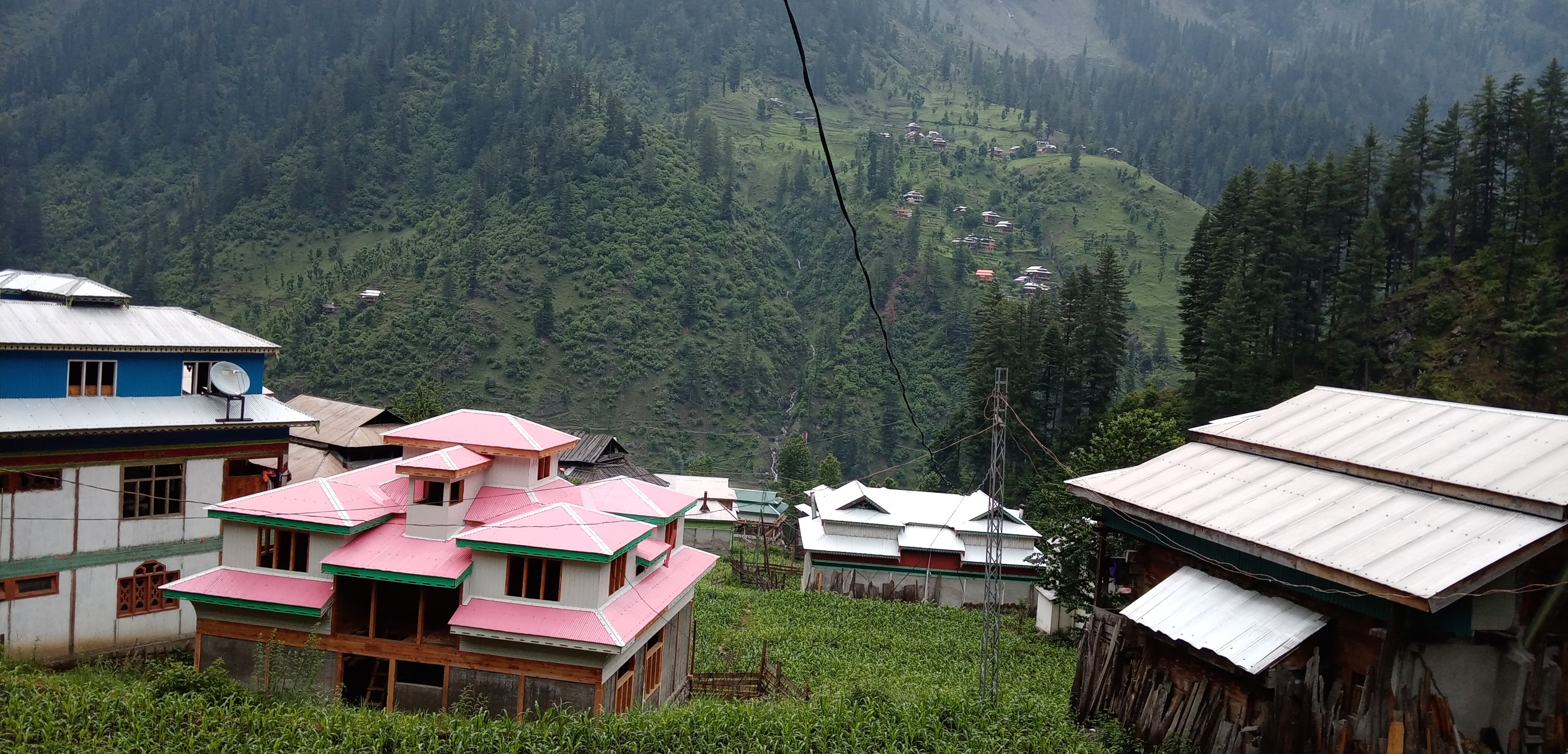
Beautiful
