= Kutton =

- Village
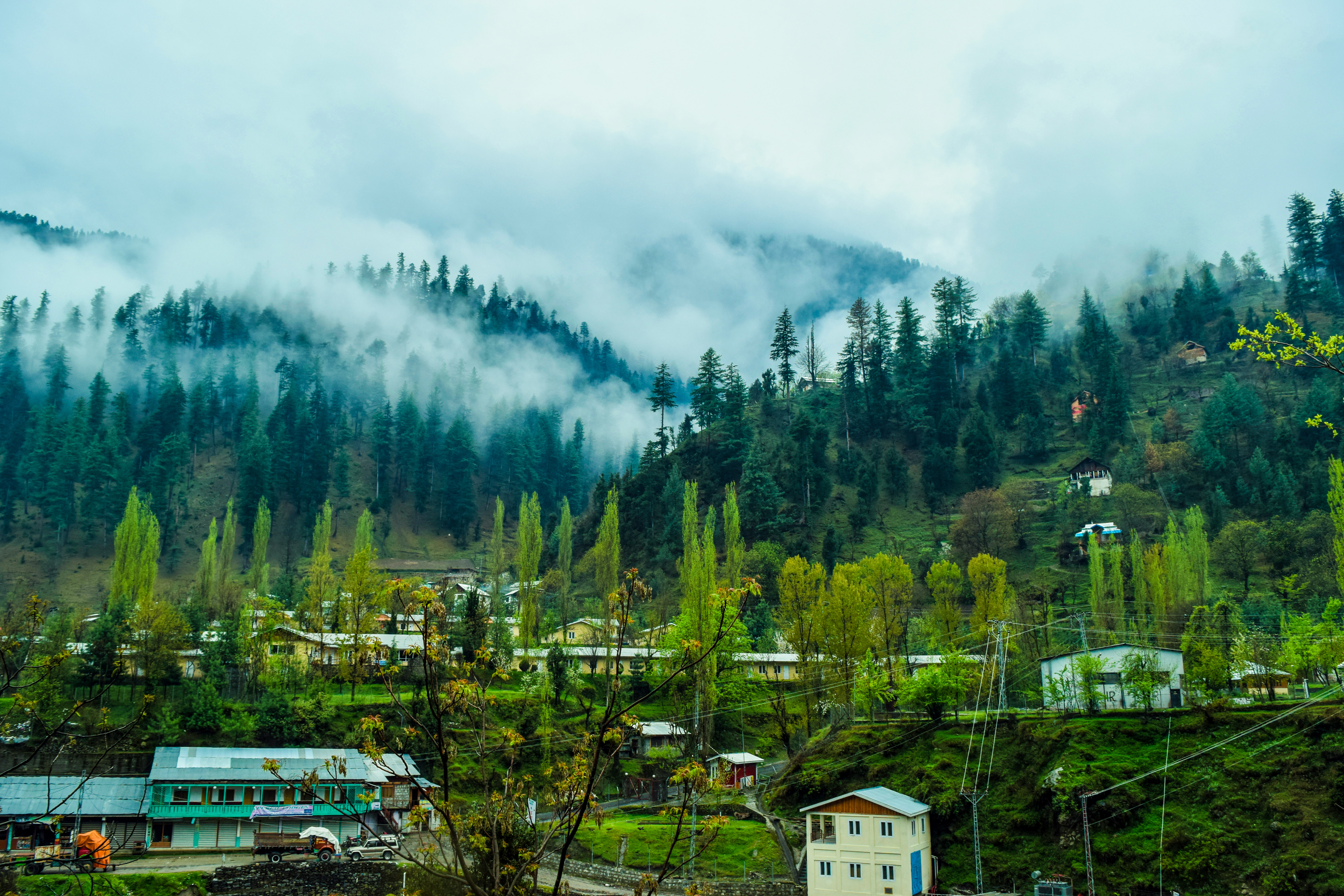
- A view of Kutton Village, Neelum Valley

- Location within Azad Kashmir Location within Pakistan
- Coordinates: 34.5617°N 73.8055°E
- Country: Pakistan
- State: Azad Jammu Kashmir
- District: Neelam
- Elevation: 1,500 m (4,800 ft)

Languages
  - Official: Urdu
- Time zone: PST

Kutton (Urdu: کٹن, also known as Jagran Valley) is a village and a tourist resort in Neelam Valley of Azad Kashmir administered by Pakistan. It is located about 98 kilometres (61 mi) from Muzaffarabad (the capital city of Azad Kashmir). Kutton is accessible by Neelam road from Muzaffarabad branches off from Kundal Shahi.

Rest houses of AJK Tourism and Archeology Department and Water and Power Development Authority (WAPDA) are located here. Some private rest houses and hotels are also available here for tourists stay.

== See also ==
- Athmuqam
- Keran
- Sharda
- Kel
