= Kel, Azad Kashmir =

Kel کیل
- Village
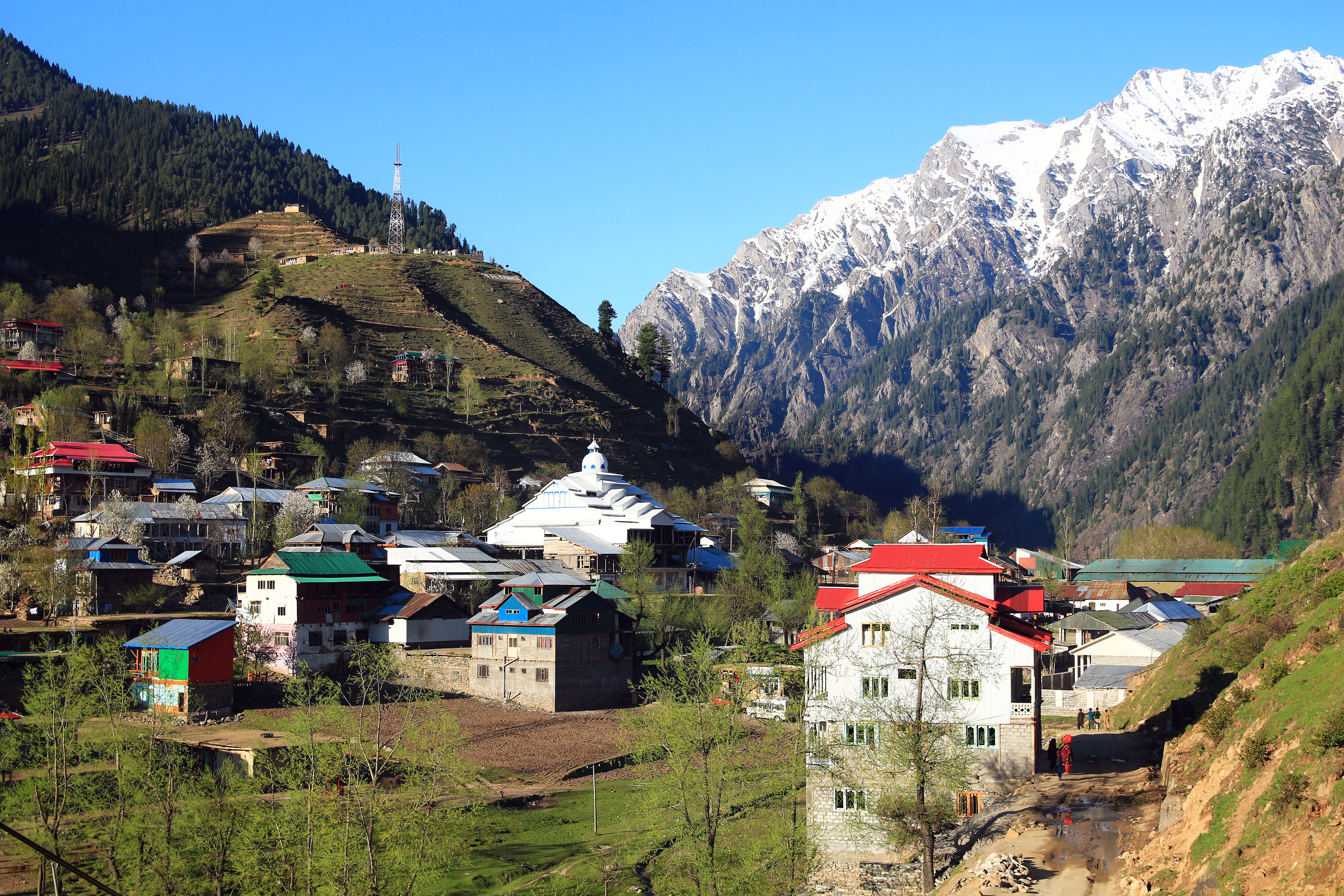
- A view of the village

- Location within Azad Kashmir
- Coordinates: 34.826914°N 74.3466764°E
- Administering Country: Pakistan
- Self-governing jurisdiction: Azad Kashmir
- District: Neelum

Government
  - Body: Azad Kashmir
- Elevation: 2,097 m (6,879 ft)

Languages
  - Official: Urdu
  - Local: Hindko, Kashmiri
- Time zone: PST

Kel (Urdu: کیل) is a village in Neelum Valley, Azad Kashmir, Pakistan.

== Transport ==
Buses run daily between Muzaffarabad and Kel.

A bus service also runs from Rawalpindi to Kel.

== Facilities ==
Private hotels and a rest house, run by AJK Tourism and Archaeology Department, are available for tourists. It has a branch of Habib Bank Limited, boys and girls degree colleges, Tehsil Headquarter hospital and a bazaar.

== See also ==
- Taobat
- Sharda
- Keran
- Kutton
