= Sharda Tehsil =

Tehsil in Azad Kashmir, Pakistan

Sharda تحصیل شاردہ
- Tehsil
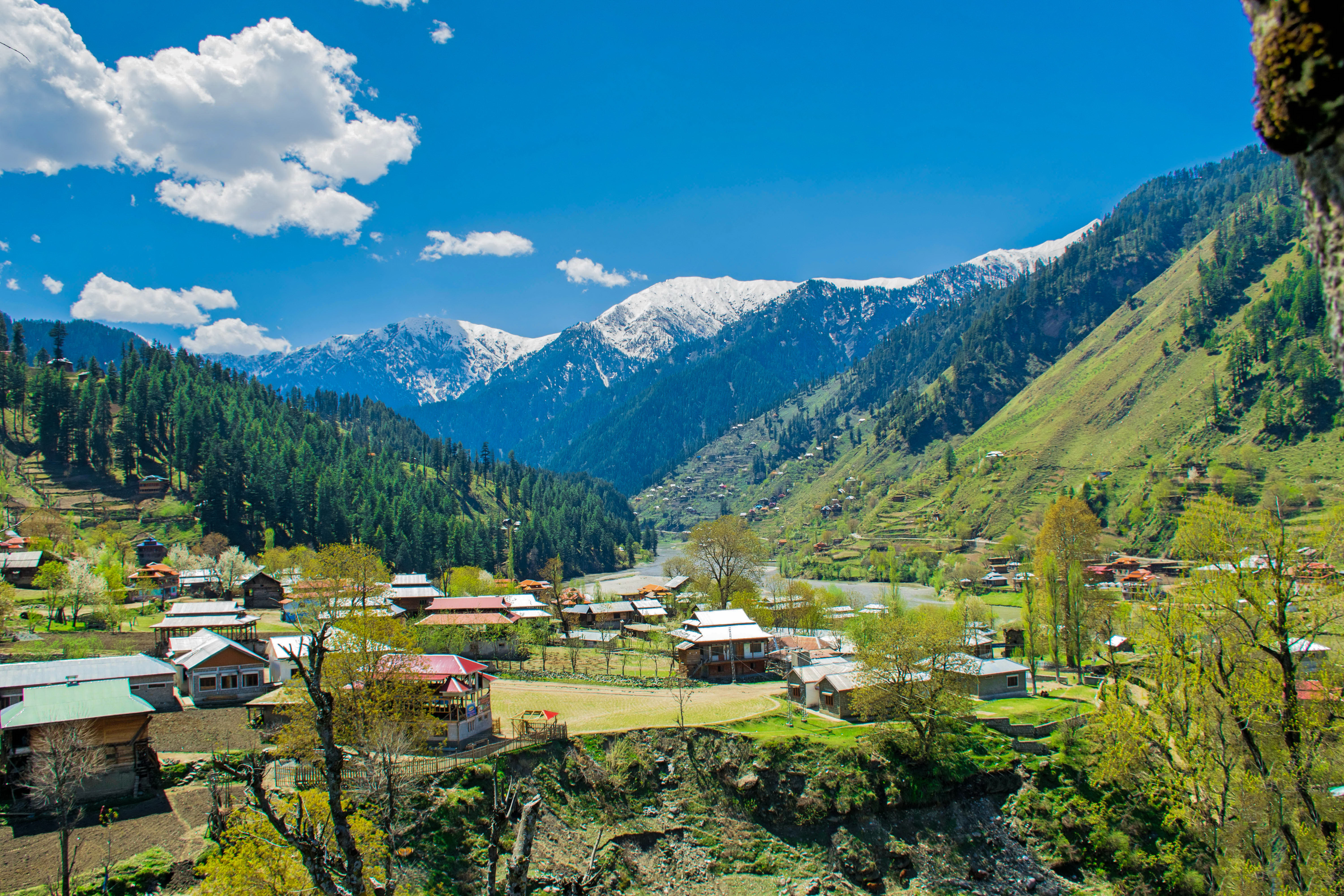
- A view of Sharda from Sharada Peeth

- Location within Azad Kashmir Location within Pakistan
- Coordinates: 34°47′35″N 74°11′19″E
- Administering country: Pakistan
- Territory: Azad Kashmir
- District: Neelum

Languages
  - Official: Urdu
  - Local: Hindko, Kashmiri
- Time zone: PST

Sharda (Urdu: شاردہ/شاردا), also known as Shardi, is a tehsil of Neelum District in Azad Kashmir, a part of Kashmir administered by Pakistan. It is located on the banks of the Neelum River at an altitude of 1,981 metres (6,499 ft).

== Etymology and historical sites ==
"Sharda" is another name of the Hindu goddess of knowledge, Saraswati, and is known for being the site of the ruins of the famous temple and Hindu pilgrimage site Sharada Peeth, dedicated to the goddess Sharada.

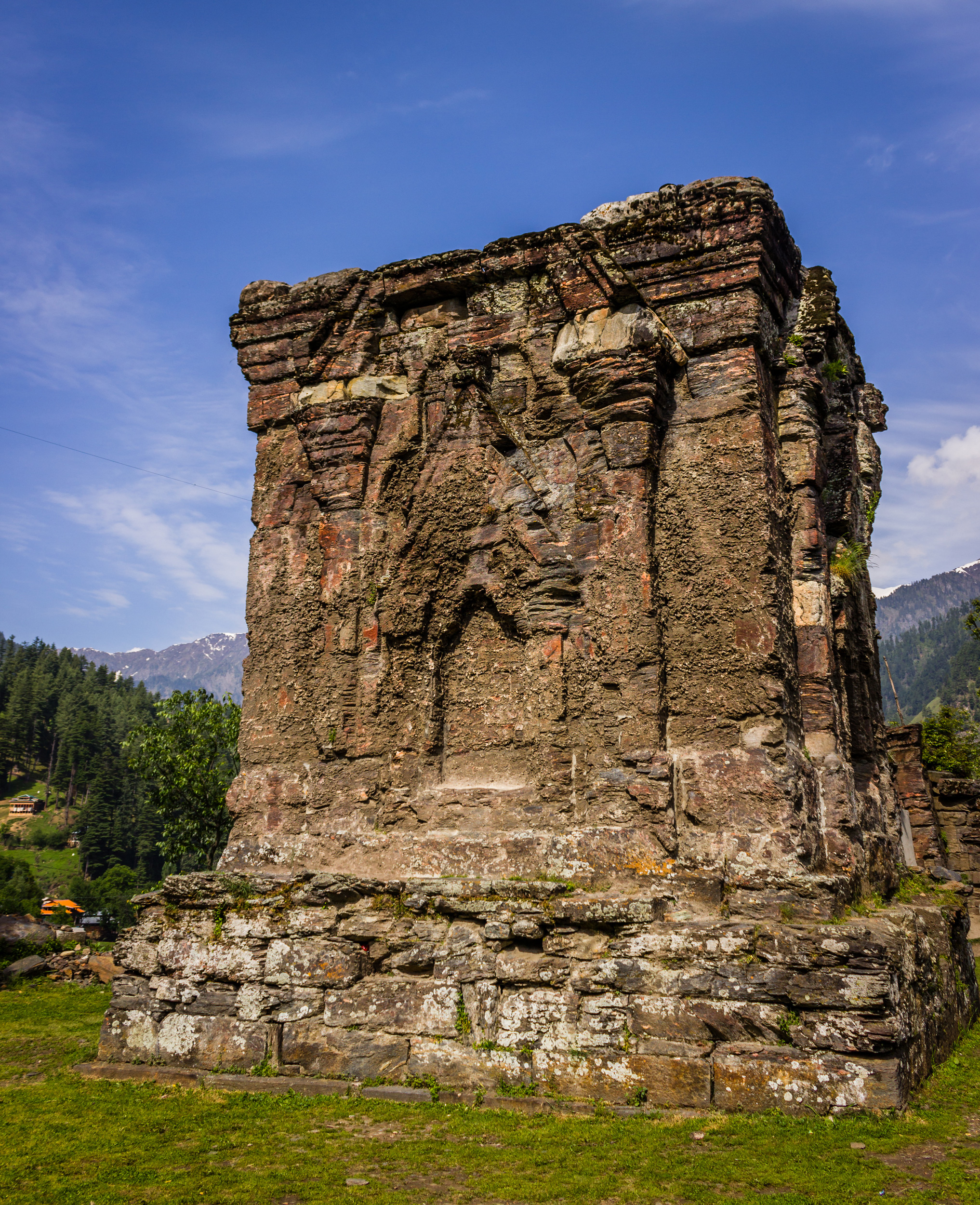
Sharada Peeth, a ruined temple dedicated to the eponymous Hindu goddess of learning

=== Sharada Peeth ===
Between the 6th and 12th centuries CE, Sharada Peeth was among the most prominent temple universities in the South Asia. Known in particular for its library, it was associated with Buddhist scholars such as Kumārajīva, Thonmi Sambhota, Rinchen Zangpo, as well as Kalhana Pandit and Adi Shankara. It played a key role in the development and popularisation of the Sharada script in North India, resulting in the script being named after it, and Kashmir acquiring the moniker "Sharada Desh", meaning "country of Sharada".

Before 1947, a fair was held in Sharda every four years during the leap year (last being 1944) on Sharda Ashtami, the 8th day of the bright fortnight of Badhun (Bhadra in Hindu Panchang calendar), where Kashmiri Pandits would assemble for Shraad rituals and ashes of those who had died during the past 12 months were immersed in Kishenganga (Neelum) river. In non-leap years, the Shraad was performed every year at Haramukh Gangabal located at 14,500 ft in the Kashmir valley.

== Nearby locations ==
Shardi and Nardi are the two mountain peaks overlooking the valley, named after the princesses of legend, Sharda and Narda. Over the right bank, opposite Sharda, the river Neelum is joined by the Surgan Nullah, along which a track leads to the Noori Nar Pass and through it to Kaghan Valley, where boating and jet skiing takes place. Attractions in Sharda include Surgan, Maidaan, Kishan Ghatti, and Sharada Peeth.

== Gallery ==
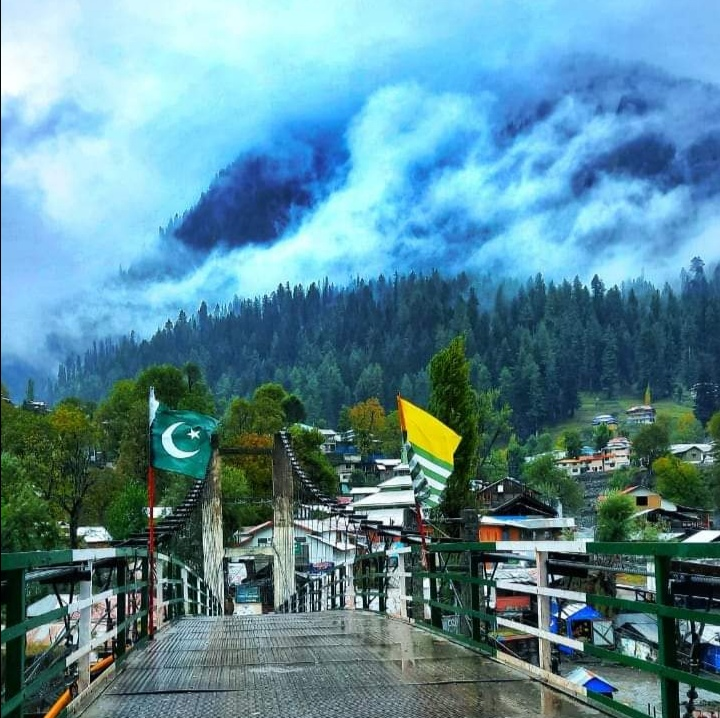

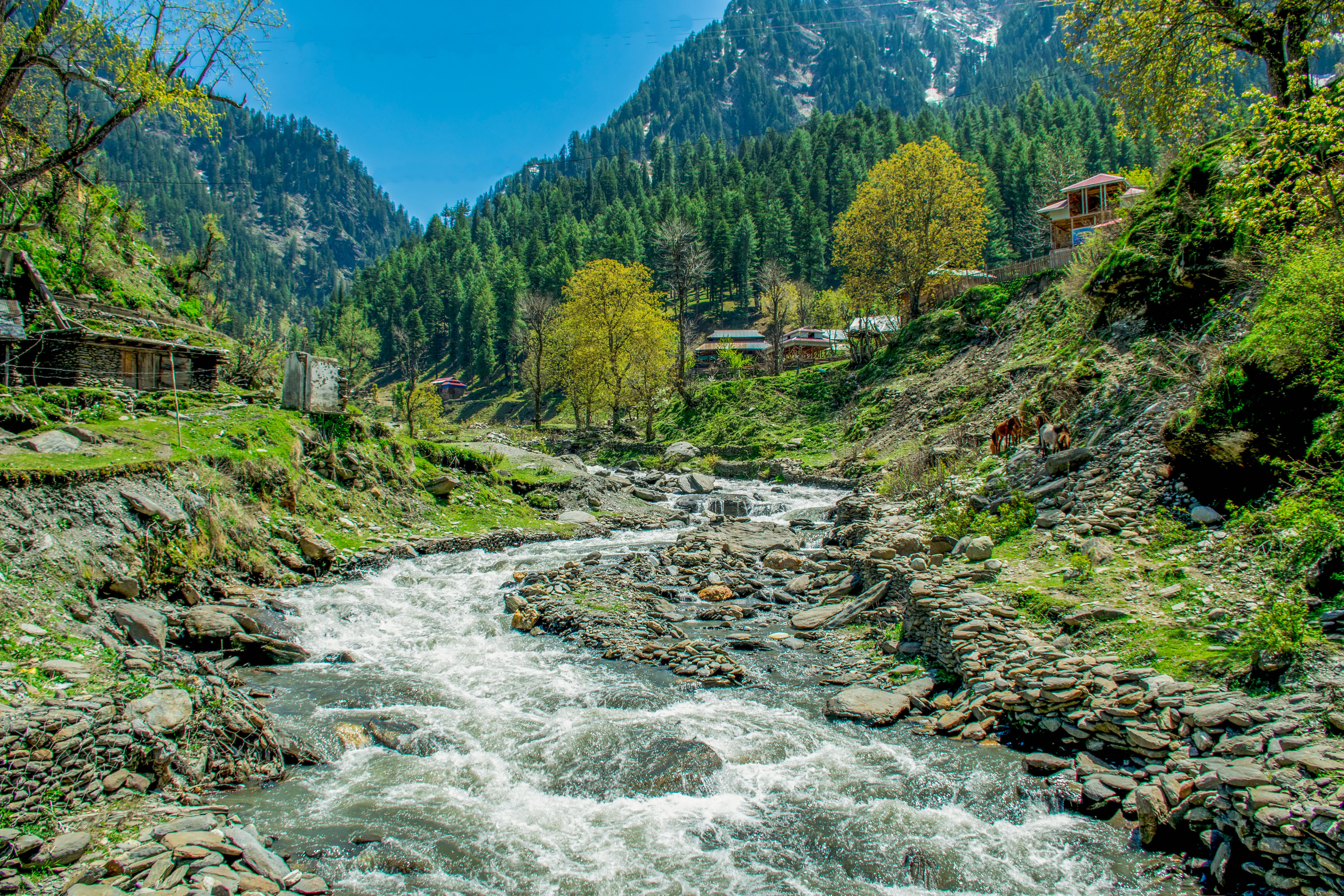

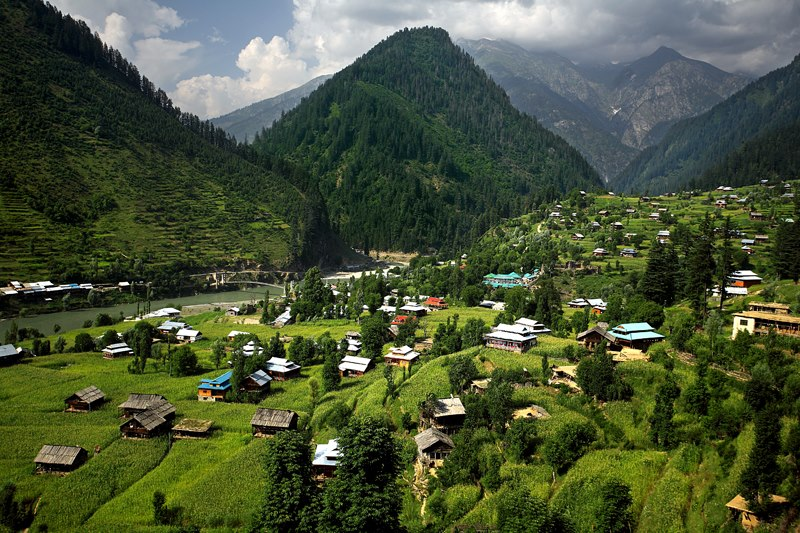

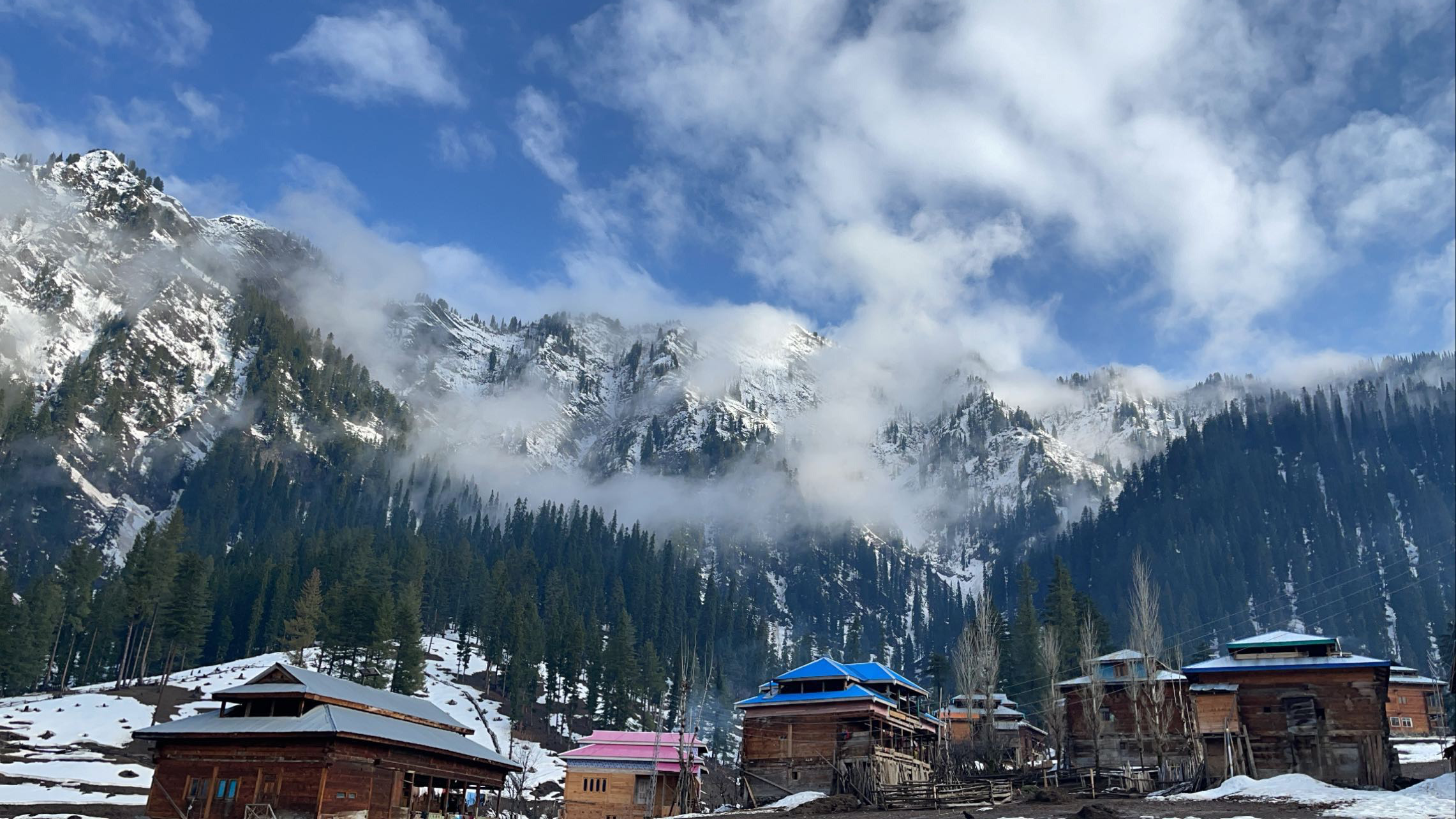

== See also ==
- Athmuqam
- Dosut
- Kel
- Keran
- Kutton
- Taobat
