= Neelum District =

District in Azad Kashmir, Pakistan

Neelum District نيٖلَم ضِلہٕ
- District of Azad Kashmir administered by Pakistan
- ضلع نیلم
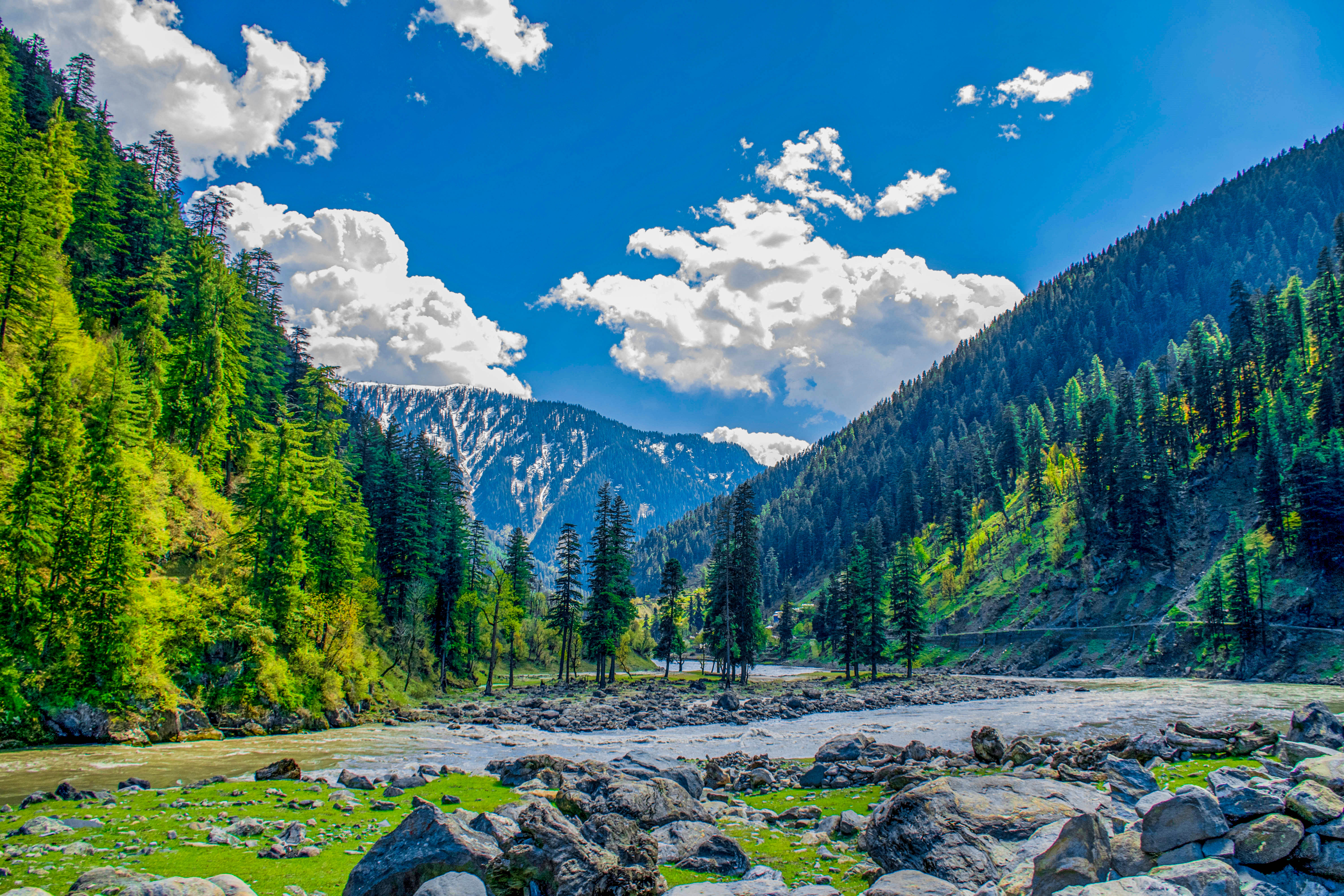
- Photograph showing the heavily-forested landscape of the Neelum Valley in April 2015
- Interactive map of Neelum district
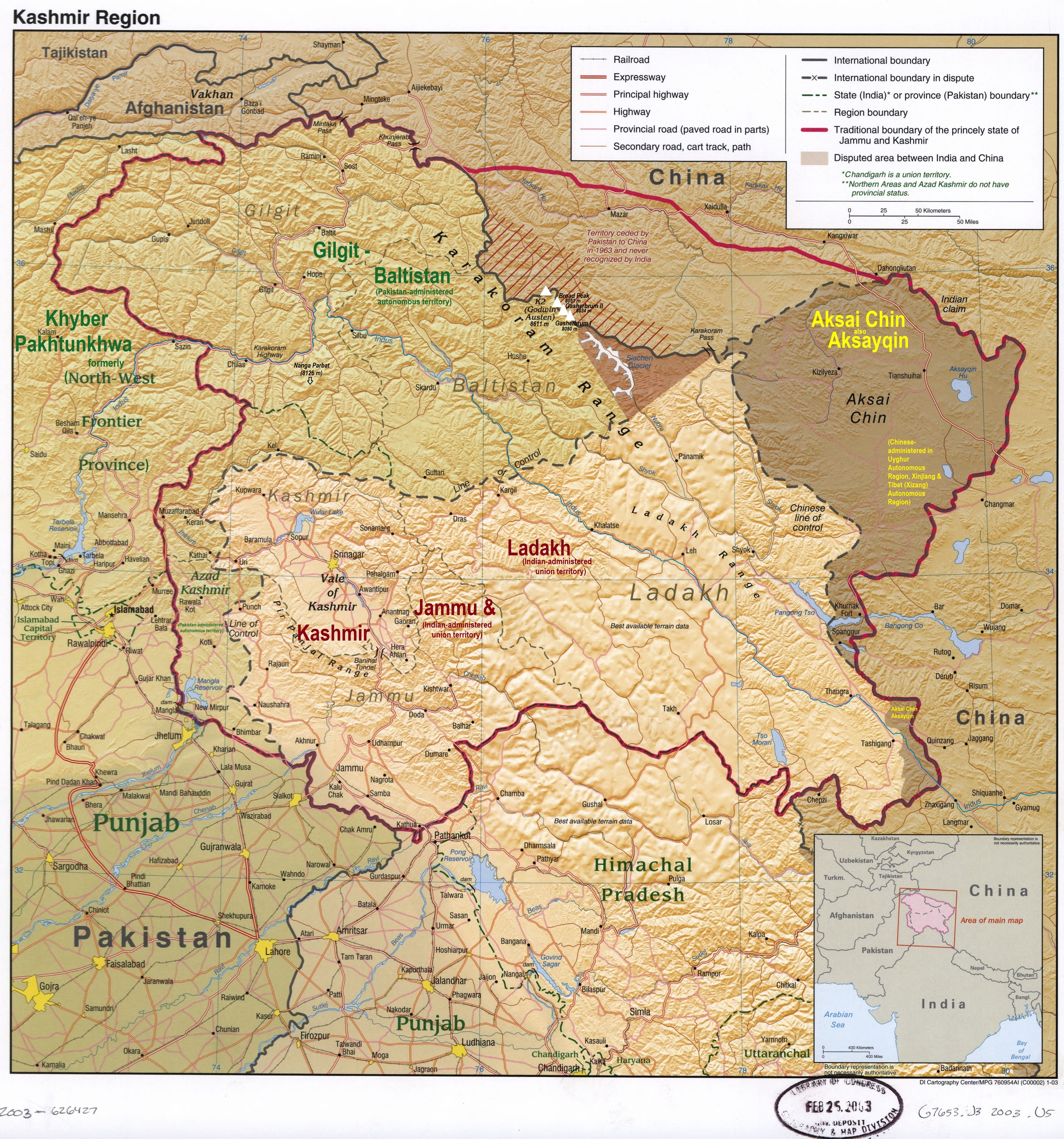
- A map showing Pakistani-administered Azad Kashmir (shaded in sage green) in the disputed Kashmir region
- Coordinates (Athmuqam): 34.59°N 73.91°E
- Administering country: Pakistan
- Territory: Azad Kashmir
- Division: Muzaffarabad Division
- Headquarters: Athmuqam

Area
  - Total: 3,621 km^{2} (1,398 sq mi)

Population (2017)
  - Total: 191,233
  - Density: 53/km^{2} (140/sq mi)

Languages
  - Official: Urdu
  - Local: Hindko, Kashmiri, Shina, Gojri, Kundal Shahi
- Number of Tehsils: 2

Neelum District (spelt also Neelam; Urdu: نیلم [niːləm], Kashmiri: نيٖلَم) is a district of Pakistan-administered territory of Azad Kashmir, in the disputed Kashmir region. It is the northernmost and the largest by land area of the ten districts of Azad Kashmir. Taking up the larger part of the Neelum Valley or the Kishanganga Valley, the district had a population of around 191,233 people as of the 2017 census. It was among the worst-hit areas of Pakistan during the 2005 Kashmir earthquake.

== Location ==
Map of the Pakistani-administered territory of Azad Jammu and Kashmir with the Neelum District highlighted in red

The district is bordered on the north and north-east by the Diamer district, the Astore district, and the Skardu District of Gilgit-Baltistan, on the south by the Kupwara district and the Bandipora district of Indian-administered Jammu and Kashmir, on the south-west by the Muzaffarabad district, and on the west by the Mansehra district of Pakistan's Khyber Pakhtunkhwa province.

The Neelum Valley was known before the partition as Kishanganga and was subsequently renamed for the village of Neelam. The Neelum River flows from the Gurez Valley in Indian-administered Jammu and Kashmir and roughly follows first a western and then a south-western course until it joins the Jhelum River at Muzaffarabad. The valley is a thickly wooded region with an elevation ranging between 4,000 feet (1,200 m) and 7,500 feet (2,300 m), with mountain peaks on either side reaching 17,000 feet (5,200 m). The Neelum Valley is 144 kilometres (89 mi) long. The Line of Control runs through the valley, either across the mountains to the south-east or in places right along the river, with several villages on the left bank falling on the Indian side of the border.

== Administration ==
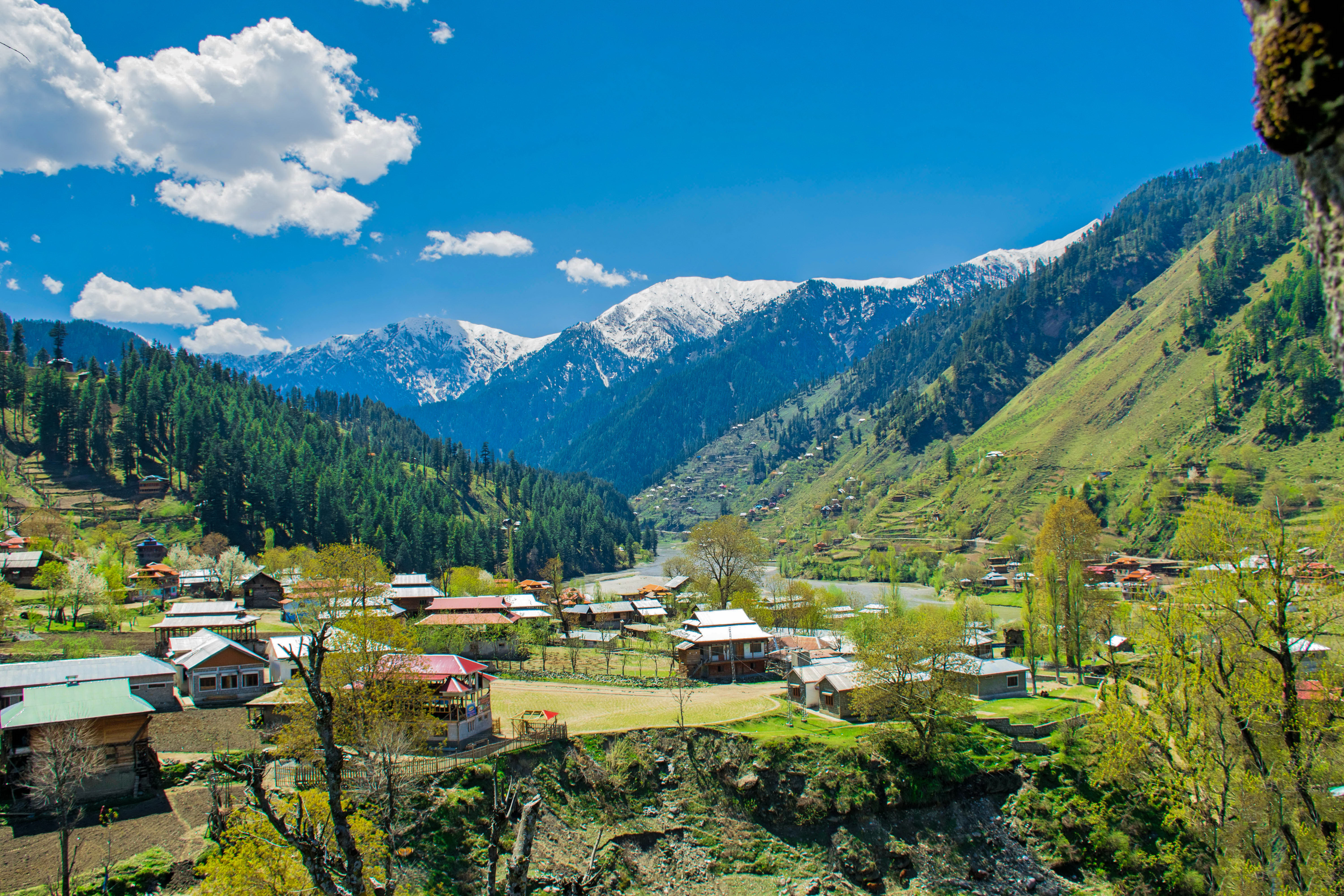
A scene of the valley in Sharda Tehsil from a fortress

The Neelum District was part of the Muzaffarabad District until 2005. It is made up of two tehsils: the Athmuqam Tehsil, in which the district headquarters is located, and the Sharda Tehsil. The Neelum District is the largest district of Azad Kashmir by area. The valley extends for approximately 200 kilometers along the Neelum River. This is a generally poor region, reliant on subsistence agriculture and handicrafts, with tourism growing in importance in recent years.

== Demographics ==
=== Social groups ===
Pahari, Kashmiri and Gujjar are three major ethnic groups of the Neelum district. Paharis make up to 60% of the population and Gujjars make up to 10% of total population of the district and they mainly speak Gujari as their mother tongue.

=== Languages ===
Several languages are spoken natively in the district. The predominant one is Hindko. It is the language of wider communication in the area and is spoken at a native or near-native level by almost all members of the other language communities, many of whom are abandoning their language and shifting to Hindko. This language is usually called Parmi (or Parimi, Pārim), a name that likely originated in the Kashmiri word apārim 'from the other side', which was the term used by the Kashmiris of the Vale of Kashmir to refer to the highlanders, who spoke this language. The language is also sometimes known as Pahari, although it bears a closer resemblance to the Hindko of neighbouring Kaghan Valley than to the Pahari spoken in the Murree Hills. Unlike other varieties of Hindko, Pahari or Punjabi, it has preserved the voiced aspirated consonants at the start of the word: for example, gha 'grass' vs. Punjabi kà, where the aspiration and voicing have been lost giving rise to a low tone on the following vowel. This sound change however, is currently spreading here as well, but it has so far only affected the villages situated along the Neelam highway. This variety of Hindko is also spoken in nearby areas of India-administered Kashmir. Since Partition, the language varieties on either side of the Line of Control have diverged in a number of ways. For example, in the Neelam Valley, there is a higher proportion of Urdu loanwords, while the variety spoken across the Line of Control has retained more traditional Hindko words.

The second most widely spoken language of the Neelam Valley is Kashmiri. It is the majority language in at least a dozen or so villages, and in about half of these, it is the sole mother tongue. It is closer to the variety spoken in northern Kashmir (particularly in Kupwara district) than to the Kashmiri of the city of Muzaffarabad.

The third-largest ethnic, though not linguistic, group are the Gujjars, whose villages are scattered throughout the valley. Most of them have switched to Hindko, but a few communities continue using the Gujari language at home. Gujari is more consistently maintained among the Bakarwal, who travel into the valley (and beyond, into Gilgit-Baltistan) with their herds in the summer and who spend the winters in the lower parts of Azad Kashmir and in Punjab.

In the upper end of the valley, there are two distinct communities speaking two different varieties of Shina (locally sometimes called Dardi). One of them is found at Taobutt and the nearby village of Karimabad (formerly known as Sutti) near the border with India. Its speakers claim that their variety of Shina is close to the one spoken further up the valley in Indian Gurez. The community is bilingual in Kashmiri and is culturally closer to the neighbouring Kashmiri communities than to the other Shina group, who inhabit the large village of Phulwei 35 kilometres (22 mi) downstream. The Shina people of Phullwei claim to have originally come from Nait near Chilas in Gilgit-Baltistan.

A Pashto dialect is spoken in two villages (Dhaki and Changnar) that are situated on the Line of Control. Because of cross-border firing since the early 1990s, there has been large-scale migration away from these villages. The local dialect is not completely intelligible with the ones spoken in the rest of Pakistan.

One language that is unique to the Neelum Valley is the endangered Kundal Shahi. It is spoken by some of the inhabitants of the Kundal Shahi village near Athmuqam.

Additionally, Urdu is spoken by the formally educated and, like English, is used as a medium of instruction in schools.

== See also ==
- Kaghan Valley
- Sharada Peeth
- Dosut

== Bibliography ==
- Akhtar, Raja Nasim; Rehman, Khawaja A. (2007). "The Languages of the Neelam Valley". Kashmir Journal of Language Research. 10 (1): 65–84. ISSN 1028-6640.
- Baart, Joan L. G.; Rehman, Khawaja A. (2005). "A first look at the language of Kundal Shahi in Azad Kashmir". SIL Electronic Working Papers.
- Faruqi, Sama (18 August 2016). "Neelum Valley: The sapphire trail". Herald (Pakistan).
- Rehman, Khawaja A. (2011). "Ergativity in Kundal Shahi, Kashmiri And Hindko". In Turin, Mark; Zeisler, Bettina (eds.). Himalayan languages and linguistics: studies in phonology, semantics, morphology and syntax. Brill's Tibetan studies library, Languages of the greater Himalayan region. Leiden : Biggleswade: Brill. pp. 219–234. doi:10.1163/ej.9789004194489.i-322.61. ISBN 978-90-04-19448-9.
- Sohail, Ayesha; Rehman, Khawaja A.; Kiani, Zafeer Hussain (2016). "Language divergence caused by LoC: a case study of District Kupwara (Jammu & Kashmir) and District Neelum (Azad Jammu & Kashmir)". Kashmir Journal of Language Research. 19 (2): 103–120. ISSN 1028-6640.
- Khan, M. A.; Trelaor, P. J.; Searle, M. P.; Jan, M. Q., eds. (2000). Tectonics of the Nanga Parbat Syntaxis and the Western Himalaya. London: Geological Society of London. ISBN 978-18-62-39061-4.
