= Imran Junaidi =

Pakistani climber (Died 2015)

Personal information
- Nationality: Pakistani
- Born: Islamabad, Pakistan

Climbing career
- Type of climber: Rock climbing, mixed climbing, mountaineering
- First ascents: Eid Mubarak, Little Trango
- Major ascents: First winter ascent of Musa ka Musalla
- Known for: First Pakistani ascent of Little Trango

Imran Junaidi (Urdu-عمران جنیدی) was a rock climber and mountaineer from Islamabad, Pakistan. Junaidi was considered one of the pioneers of big wall climbing in Pakistan. He is best known for first Pakistani ascent of Malika Parbat (5,290 m (17,360 ft)), and a new route on little Trango (5,455 m (17,897 ft)) in the Trango group.

In 2015, Junaidi, along with two other teammates, went missing while on an expedition to climb Sarwali Peak. His remains were recovered in 2024, nine years after his disappearance. Junaidi was 33.

== Climbing ==
Junaidi began climbing at an early age. As a rock climber, Junaidi was the winner of several national level rock climbing competitions and was known for his speed ascents.

Competition records

- 3rd place at All Pakistan Rock Climbing Competition - 2010 (18+), Jasmine Center Maragalla Hills, 2010
- 1st place at IMD 2010 Climbing Competition ( 19 + / Open ), Ibex club Islamabad, 2010
- 2nd place at IMD 2010 Climbing Competition ( Open – Pro/Tech ), Ibex club Islamabad, 2010
- 1st Place at 5th Pakistan Open Rock Climbing Competition on IWD - 2011 (Professional Difficulty), Jasmine Center Maragalla Hills, 2011
- 1st Place at Pakistan Day Rock Climbing Competition - 2011 (Speed climbing), Islamabad, 2011
- 2nd Place at IMD Pakistan Open Climbing Competition - 2011 (18+), Ibex club Islamabad, 2011

== Mountaineering ==
In addition to rock climbing, Junaidi was a mountaineer and a founding member of the Pakistan Alpine Institute. He set new routes in the Margalla hills and the Chenab Rocks in central Punjab. He has also engaged in climbing/rescue training, social work and motivational speaking.

In 2012, Junaidi was part of the first Pakistani-Danish climbing expedition, climbing Malika Parbat (5,290 m (17,360 ft)) in Kaghan Valley. It is the highest peak of Hazara division and noted for its technical difficulty. Junaidi climbed with Jens J. Simonsen, reaching the summit on 27 July 2012 via the north ridge.

In 2014 he took part in an exploratory expedition to find out possibilities of frozen waterfall climbing in the Kaghan valley of the Pakistani Himalayas.

=== Little Trango ===
In July 2014 he successfully climbed "Little Trango", a 5,445 m (17,864 ft) granite tower in the Trango group in the Karakoram range. On reaching the base camp, he along with his two climbing partners Usman Tariq and Owais Khattak spent three days transporting gear to the high camp at 4,800 m (15,700 ft) at the base of the tower. He and Usman started on the southwest side of the formation but reached a dead end and had to traverse right to join the American route on the south face. In total, the duo climbed 250 m (820 ft) at 5.10d A0 in two days. Imran Junaidi lead all the nine pitches and they decided to name the route "Eid Mubarak".

== Accident at Sarwali Peak ==
In August 2015, Imran Junaidi, Usman Tariq and Khurram Shehzad took part in an expedition to Sarwali Peak (also called Toshe Ri) in Neelum valley, Azad Kashmir. The 6,326-metre (20,755 ft) mountain had never been summitted. On 30 August they established a high camp at 5,000 m (16,000 ft). The next day they were last seen at around 5,500 m (18,000 ft) after which communication was lost with the base camp. After continued radio silence, base camp manager Awais descended to the nearest town Kel and requested search and rescue on 4 September. A search and rescue was started on 7 September. No trace was ever found of the climbers. Judging by the region of the highest camp reached and terrain, falling into a crevice was decided to be the most probable cause of the accident.

== Recovery ==
In September 2024, a team of Pakistani climbers and porters successfully retrieved the bodies of three mountaineers who had been missing on Sarwali Peak (also known as Dabbar Peak) in Azad Kashmir for nine years. The climbers, Imran Junaidi, Usman Khalid, and Khurram Shehzad, had gone missing in August 2015 while attempting to summit the peak.

A special rescue team was formed to recover the bodies, which were located near the advance base camp at the right saddle of the mountain. Two dozen volunteers, including climbers, rescuers, and porters, participated in the mission, bringing down the bodies from a height of 16,000 feet.

The recovery of the bodies brought closure to the families of the missing mountaineers and marked the end of a long search. The incident also highlighted the dangers of mountaineering and the importance of proper preparation and safety measures.
