= YFK-International Kashmir Lobby Group =

YFK-International Kashmir Lobby Group (Youth Forum for Kashmir) (full name) is a non-governmental organization working on strategies for peaceful conflict resolution and protection of human rights in the disputed region of Jammu & Kashmir (Indian-administered and Pakistan-administered Kashmir). Headquartered in Islamabad, Pakistan, YFK is a registered NGO run by rotating teams of specialists in human rights, diplomacy, and international law, drawn from university scholars and students, journalists, members of the academia, young political activists, and human rights defenders from mainly Pakistan and AJK (Azad Kashmir). This includes young Kashmiris from refugee families that sought exile in Pakistan after escaping violence in Kashmir post-1989. The organization advocates for the right to self-determination for Kashmiris through a plebiscite to decide whether Kashmir joins India or Pakistan, as provisioned under United Nations Security Council Resolution 47.The OIC Grneral's Special Envoy for Jammu and Kashmir Ambassador Yousef Aldoubeay delivered a keynote address at a "Conflict Resolution Workshop Resolution Workshop" organized by YFK in collaboration with ISSI.

== History ==
YFK (abbreviated) was founded in 2013 by Muhammed Mian Soomro, a Pakistani politician who served as a banker, and a former Senate chairman. He currently serves as the Federal Minister for Privatization. The idea stemmed from generational shifts in the conflict in India, Pakistan, and Kashmir that required a new approach to conflict-resolution without compromising principles. It is one of many Kashmir-related organizations created in Pakistan, a country that is home to the second largest Kashmiri population outside the historic State of Jammu & Kashmir. Pakistan is also home to Kashmiri refugees from various India-Pakistan wars over the territory. YFK receives donations from Pakistani and Kashmiri businessmen to fund its operations. The organization is audited by private accountants and it is accountable, as an NGO, to the Securities and Exchange Commission of Pakistan (SECP).

== Conflict and human rights ==
The organization refers to itself as ‘YFK-International Kashmir Lobby Group’ in the long form or simply YFK. It liaises with the Ministry of Foreign Affairs of Pakistan, the Government of Azad Jammu & Kashmir, United Nations mechanisms, and likeminded INGOs to build momentum for the peaceful end to the conflict in Kashmir, and to promote the civil and political rights of Kashmiris. To achieve these objectives, YFK works with media organizations; publishes policy briefs and conducts seminars and workshops.

The organization has listed Kashmiri identity and culture as key concerns, and fears fatigue, time, and other international developments could further diminish the already limited global interest in this conflict. To generate and circulate knowledge on Kashmir in this long, drawn-out conflict, YFK conducts training sessions to prepare speakers conversant in various aspects of the conflict (political, legal, women, children, human rights, diplomacy) to engage a global audience.

== Notable staff ==
YFK is a relatively young organization (established in 2013). Some of the notable persons associated with it, currently and in the past, are:

- Muhammad Mian Soomro, founding patron-in-chief
- Sardar Asadullah Khan, a politician from AJK
- Altaf Hussain Wani, a teacher and academic from Indian-administered Kashmir, board member, YFK; chairman, Kashmir Institute of International Relations (KIIR)
- Qaswar Saeed Mirza, former senior communications official, Presidency of Pakistan (deceased)
- Nawabzada Riaz Hussain Qureshi, agriculturalist, and politician (deceased)
- Ahmed Quraishi, Pakistani journalist, and former executive director at YFK
- Zaman Bajwa Executive Director YFK; Recipient of Journalism award by the government of Azerbaijan
- Sardarzada Umair Hasni, advisor to Chief Minister of Balochistan
- Shaista Safi, rights activist, and daughter of Kashmiri politician Ghulam Mohammad Safi
- Maria Iqbal Tarana, Former member YFK, Pakistani woman rights activist and politician from AJK
- Maria Atiq, Pakistani diplomat, interned with YFK during university before joining the foreign service
- Ghulam Shabbir, Former Pakistani media producer and digital media advocacy activist

== Publications ==
Producing books and papers on Kashmir is a stated YFK objective, mainly due to a general scarcity of books on Kashmir in Pakistan, India, and internationally. India's Hindustan Times notes that, "Unlike Palestine and Northern Ireland, not much has been written about Kashmir." YFK representatives have complained at various speaking engagements that the organization's library of books and publications contains few quality works on Kashmir produced in Pakistan.

Titles of some recent YFK publications:

- Global Reactions to Kashmir Crisis
- Changing Language and Ethnicity: India on a Warpath in Kashmir
- I Saw Them Execute My Mother. I Was Eleven. The Story of Aneesa Nabi
- Conflict Through Art: Creative Work on Kashmir Lockdown
- Isolated, Bitter, and Suicidal in Kashmir

== Criticism ==
Critics (mostly on social media) have criticized YFK-International Kashmir Lobby Group for not more robustly criticizing Government of Pakistan policies on Kashmir. Ideological Kashmiri activists that promote Kashmir independence from both India and Pakistan view YFK as a status quo organization. YFK has also been dubbed a pro-Pakistan lobby group. Variations of these criticisms have been received by YFK accounts on Twitter in the 2014–2020 period.

In their various speaking engagements, YFK lobbyists have defended themselves by citing their varied work, writings, and activism where they criticized Pakistani officials, and where they did not align with official Pakistani positions on contacts with India, insisting on maintaining close contacts with members of Indian civil society when Pakistan and India downgraded their diplomatic relations; also welcoming former President Trump’s statements on Kashmir despite the cool reception from the Pakistani government and political parties, and taking the lead in showing empathy for the citizens of India during the 2021 COVID surge and oxygen shortage.

Some YFK members publicly criticized Pakistan government's diplomatic focus on Gaza-Israel conflict in May 2021, and compared it to what they said was tepid Pakistani diplomacy on Kashmir.

Generally, YFK positions on Kashmir policies of India and Pakistan strike a balance between criticism and lobbying.

== Achievements ==
Between 2013 and 2021, YFK played a role in mobilising Pakistan's media and public opinion on Kashmir, contributing to a noticeable gradual return of interest in Kashmir-related developments to the limelight in Pakistani politics. In the process, several YFK members became authorities on the subject for Pakistani media and Pakistan-based international media.

On 4 February 2021, a senior YFK official announced that "India is not an enemy for Pakistan and Kashmiris." The conciliatory statement was important because it was made at the Presidency of Pakistan in Islamabad in front of a select audience that included the President of Pakistan, the Foreign Minister, and the National Security Advisor. The event was broadcast on state-run television.

In 2014, YFK introduced the term ‘Kashmir is the unfinished agenda of Pakistani independence.’ The term, first used in a YFK press statement on Pakistan Resolution Day in March 2014, captured the imagination of Pakistani media and political elite and was tweeted by the spokesman of Pakistan Armed Forces on 3 June 2015, and borrowed later by former Chief of Army Staff Gen. Raheel Sharif in a speech he made on the same day.

On 10 March 2018, a short film produced by YFK on the life of prominent Pakistani human rights activist Asma Jahangir was screened at a side event at the UN Human Rights Council in Geneva.
