= Al-Khair University =

Al-Khair University (AJK)
- Type: private
- Established: July 4, 1994
- Founders: Dr. Muhammad Bashir Goraya (Late)
- Chairman: Muhammad Imtiaz Aqdas Goraya [Pro-Chancellor]
- Chancellor: The Honorable President AJ&K
- Vice-Chancellor: Professor Dr. Muhammad Asghar / Resigned
- Rector: Professor Dr. A.Q Ansari / Resigned
- Location: Bhimber, Azad Kashmir, Pakistan
- Language: English
- Website: alkhair.edu.pk

Al-Khair University is a private university located in Azad Kashmir, Pakistan. The university has been sanctioned by Pakistan's Higher Education Commission and numerous court decisions have required the university to cease awarding degrees, not admit students and to close campuses. Media outlets in Pakistan have termed the university a "degree mill" which sold degrees.
