= University of Poonch =

University in Azad Kashmir, Pakistan

University of Poonch Rawalakot (UPR)
- Motto: Enter to learn, leave to serve!
- Type: Public
- Established: 2014; 12 years ago
- Affiliations: Pakistan Veterinary Medical Council
- Chancellor: Sultan Mehmood Chaudhry, president of Azad Jammu and Kashmir
- Vice-Chancellor: Dr. Zakria Zakar
- Location: Rawalakot, Azad Kashmir, Pakistan; 33.845750°N 73.774149°E
- Website: upr.edu.pk

University of Poonch is a public university located in Rawalakot, Azad Kashmir, Pakistan. The university has 3 different campuses: The Main campus in Rawalakot, the Kahuta campus, and the Mong campus. As of 2017, the university has 7 faculties consisting of 26 departments.

== Faculties ==
The university has seven faculties comprising 26 departments:

Faculty of Agriculture:

Departments: Food science & Technology, Agricultural economics, Horticulture, Entomology, Agronomy, Plant pathology, Plant breeding & Molecular genetics, and Soil & Environmental sciences.

Faculty of Medical & Health sciences:

Departments: Pharmacy, and Eastern medicine & Surgery.

Faculty of Management sciences:

Departments: Business administration, and Commerce.

Faculty of Basic & Applied sciences:

Departments: Computer sciences, Chemistry, Physics, Zoology, Mathematics, Botany, and Earth sciences.

Faculty of Humanities and Social sciences:

Departments: Economics, English, Sociology, Psychology, and Islamic studies.

Faculty of Engineering & Technology:

Departments: Electrical engineering.

Faculty of Veterinary & Animal sciences:

Departments: Veterinary & Animal sciences.

== Affiliation ==
The university of Poonch is affiliated with the Pakistan Veterinary Medical Council.

== Recognition ==
In addition to its affiliate, the university is also recognized by institutions including the Higher Education Commission of Pakistan, the Pharmacy Council of Pakistan, and the National Council for Tibb.

== See also ==
- List of institutions of higher education in Azad Kashmir
