= Muhammad Hayyat Khan =

Pakistani politician

Muhammad Hayyat Khan was at one time president of Azad Kashmir, Pakistan.
