= Sarwali Peak =

Mountain in Pakistan

- Dabbar Peak; Toshe Ri; Toshain-I
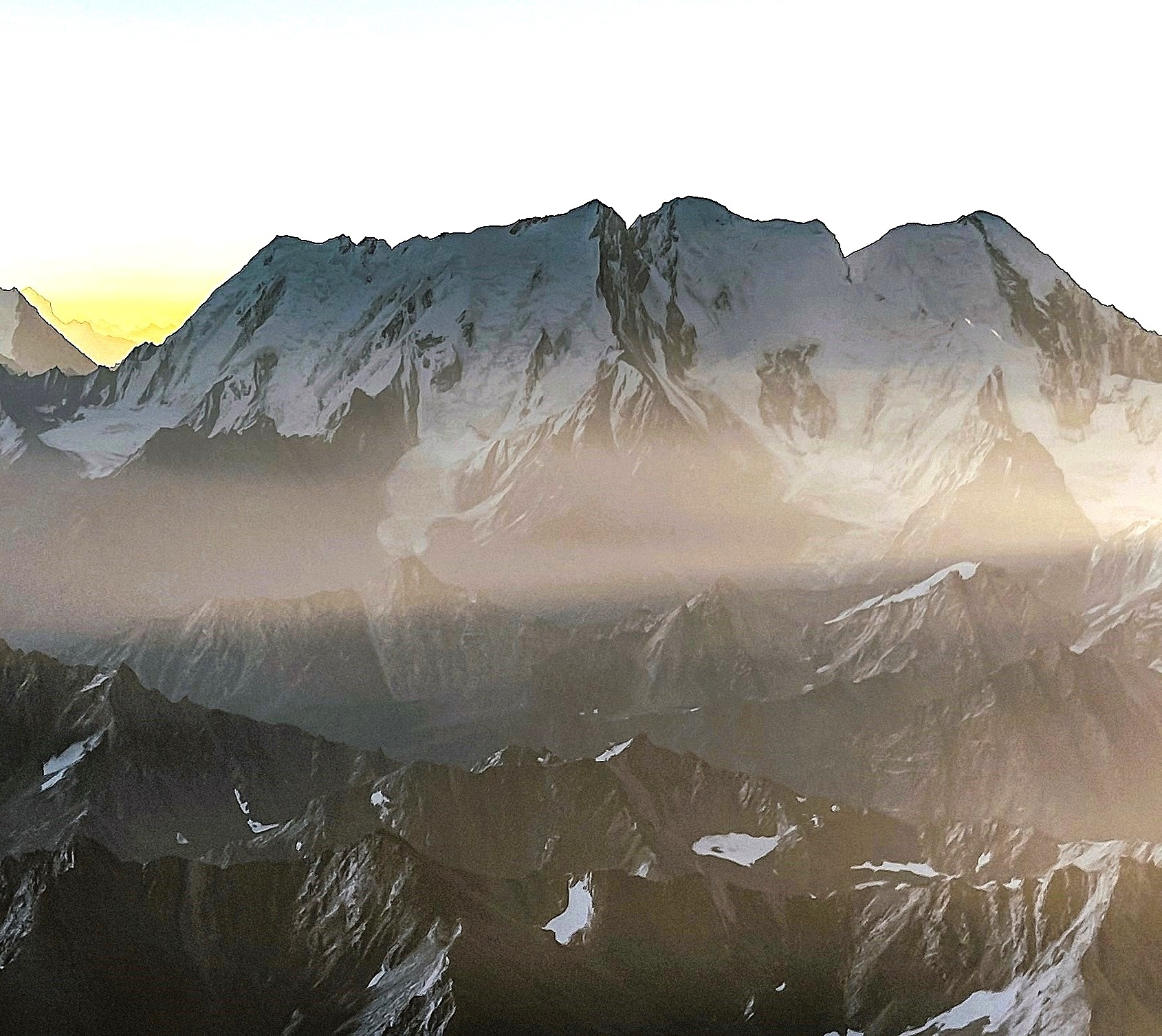
- West aspect at sunrise

Highest point
- Elevation: 6,424 m (21,076 ft)
- Coordinates: 35.1315349626257°N 74.4369620364568°E

Geography
- Location within Kashmir

Sarwali Peak, also known as Dabbar Peak, Toshe Ri, and Toshain-I, is a mountain peak located in the Shounter Valley at the border of Astore District of Gilgit-Baltistan and Neelum District of the Pakistan-administered Azad Kashmir, in the disputed Kashmir region. At an altitude of 6,424 metres (21,076 ft), it is the highest point in Azad Jammu and Kashmir.

It is located 18.3 km southwest of Nanga Parbat, the ninth highest peak in the world.

== Climbing history ==
There has been no documented successful ascent of the peak. The ridge line that forms Toshain walls houses Toshain II, Toshain III, Toshain IV and Toshain V (Shounter Peak), which all are technical in nature and heavily glaciated. The peak is located on Toshain/Rupal Glacier towering in Rupal Valley of Nanga Parbat.

In 2004, an expedition from the Kashmir Tourism Department abandoned their summit attempt after their team leader experienced altitude sickness.

In 2009, German climbers Robert Koschitzki and Christian Walter reached Sarwali Peak's foresummit, 150m below the true summit. They had to turn back due to high avalanche danger.

In 2015, a Pakistani expedition made an attempt on the peak, approaching from Sarwali Glacier. On 31 August, climbers Imran Junaidi, Khurram Rajpoot, and Usman Tariq began their summit push. After being sighted at 5,500m, the climbers lost contact with the remainder of their team. Despite search and rescue efforts, they could not be found.

On 29 June 2019, Simon Messner soloed the summit of Toshe III, locally known as Geshot.

On 12 August 2024, the bodies of the three missing climbers from 2015 were discovered by Imran Arif and his climbing partner while trekking on the mountain near the advance base camp on the right saddle of the mountain. A special recovery team was formed on 03 September 2024, and on 07 September the bodies were finally recovered after missing nine years on the mountain. The bodies were brought to a hospital in Kel, Azad Kashmir before finally being laid to rest.
