= Devi Gali =

Devi Gali Aamir Hussain Shaheed Gali
- Village
- Location within Azad Kashmir
- Coordinates: 33.7708°N 73.8570°E
- Country: Pakistan
- State: Azad Kashmir
- District: Poonch
- Elevation: 1,670 m (5,480 ft)

Languages
  - Official: Urdu
- Time zone: PST

Devi Gali (Urdu: دیوی گلی) (also known as Aamir Hussain Shaheed Gali abbreviated as Shaheed Gali) is a village and a tourist attraction in Poonch District of Azad Kashmir, Pakistan. It is located 8 kilometers (5.0 mi) from Hajira, 12 kilometers (7.5 mi) from Banjosa, and 32 kilometers (20 mi) from Rawalakot an altitude of 1,670 meters (5,480 ft).

Devi Gali has lush green grassy grounds surrounded by densely pine forest and mountains. The name Devi Gali is linked to this area's history. According to locals, this spot was a place of worship for Hindus, years before independence of Azad Kashmir. It is narrated that during those days a Devi (Hindu Queen) visits this place to worship in a temple located nearby. The temple was later on destroyed in early years of 21st century.
