= Azad Kashmir =

Region administered by Pakistan

Azad Jammu and Kashmir: آزاد جموں و کشمیر; Āzād Jammū̃ o Kaśmīr
- Administered by Pakistan as a self-administrative territory
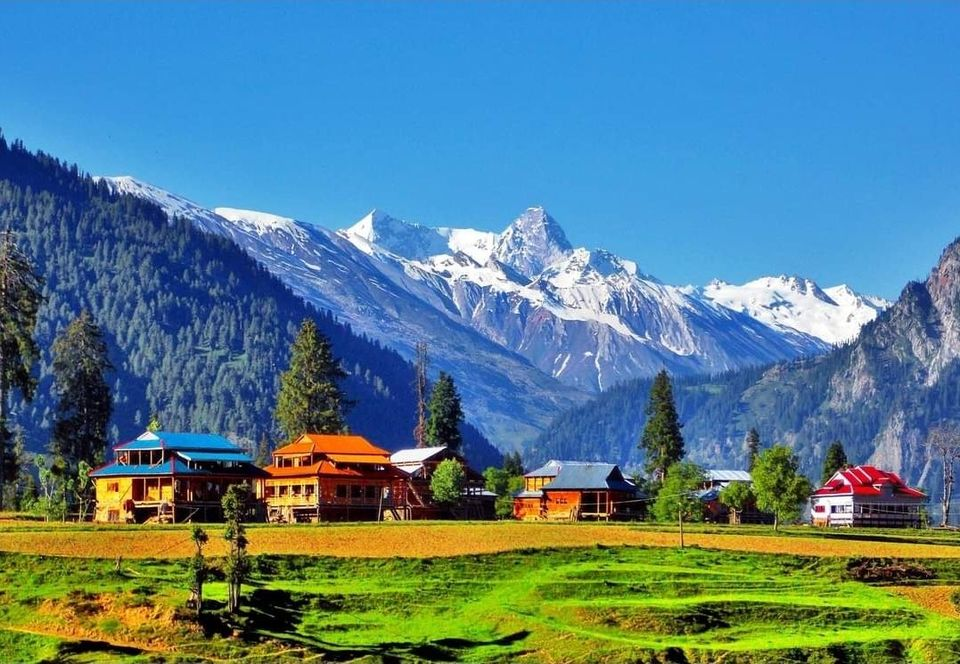
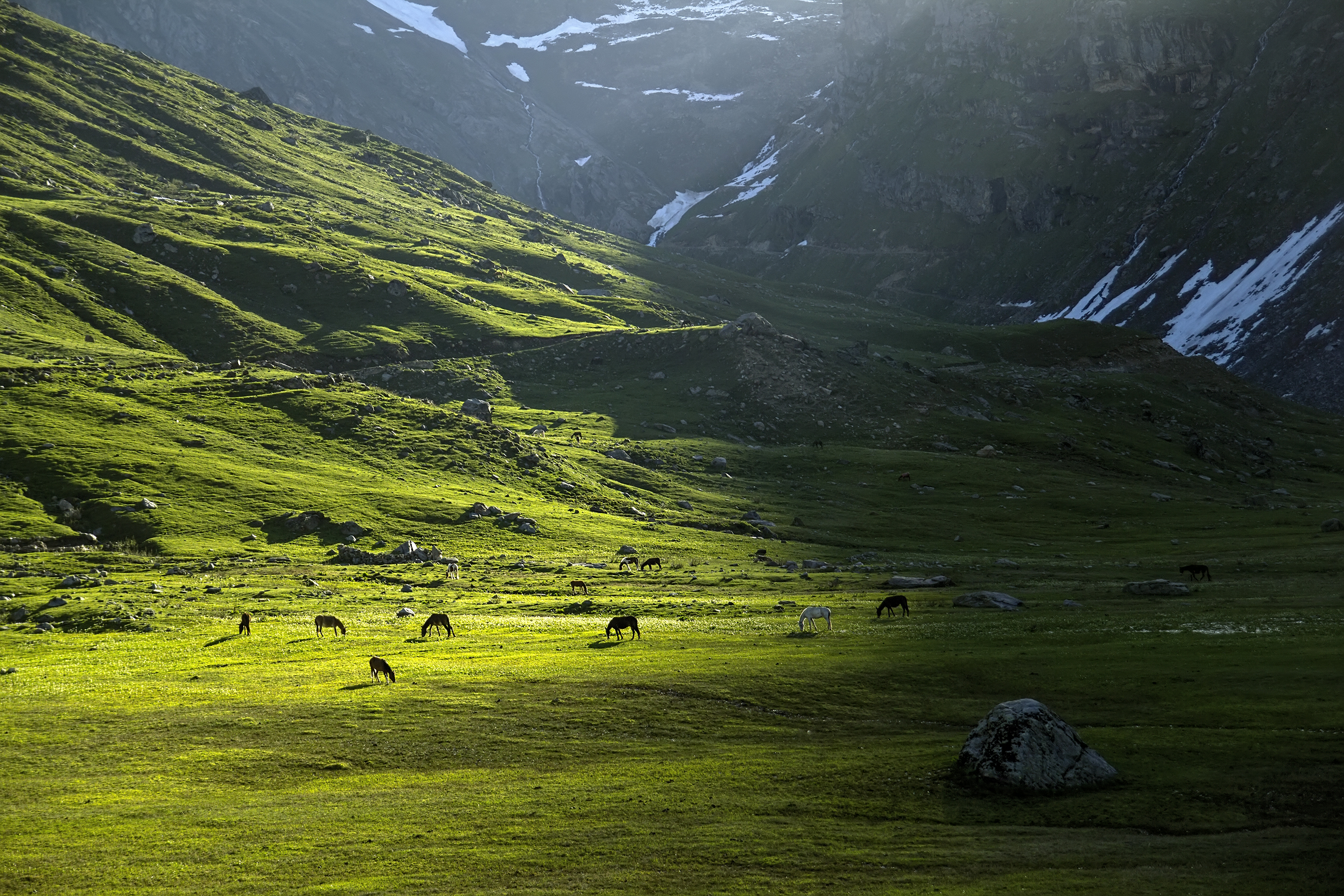
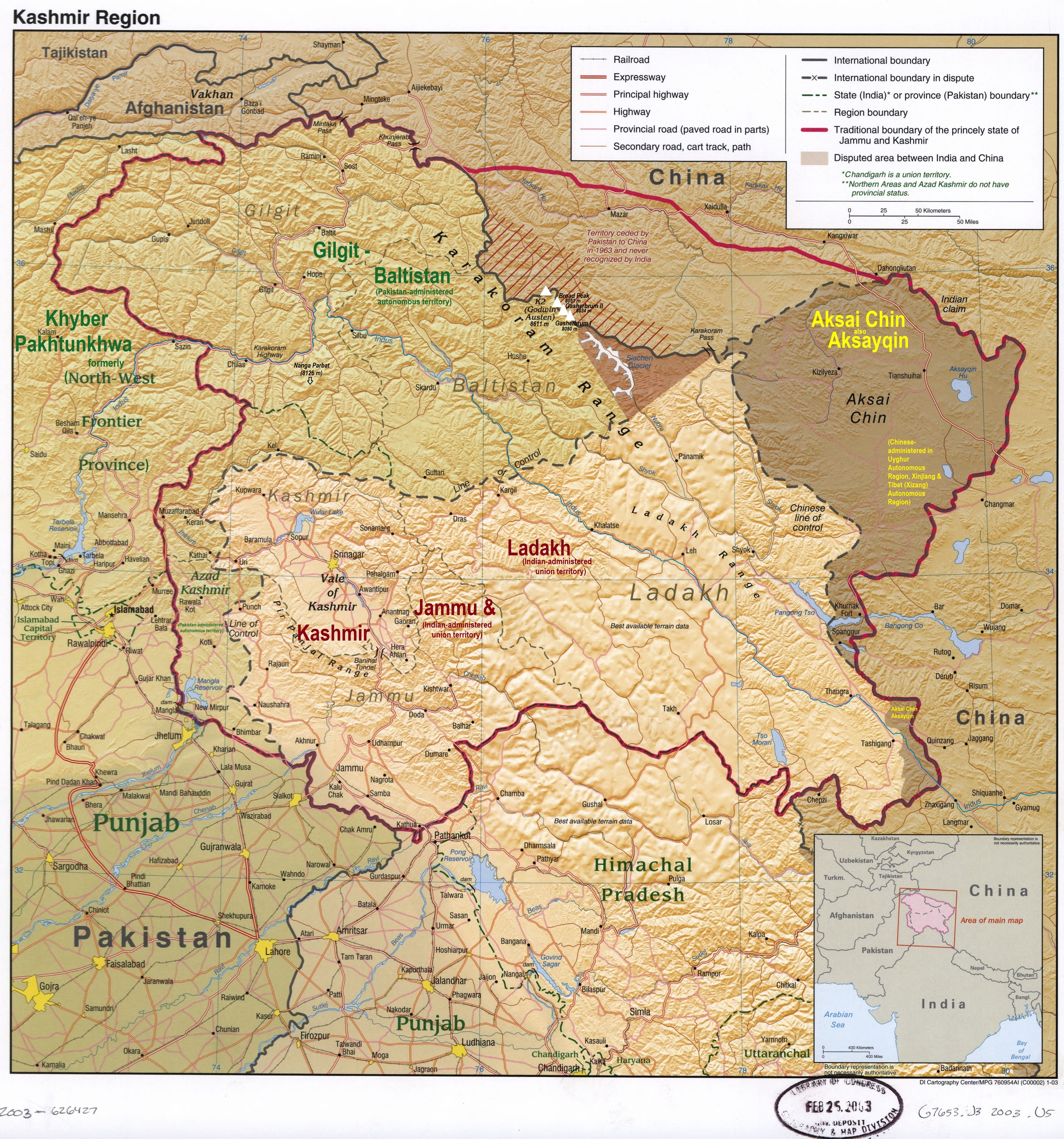
- Top: Arang Kel; Middle: Shounter Valley; Bottom: A map of the disputed Kashmir region with the two Pakistan-administered areas shaded in sage-green.
- Etymology: "Free Kashmir" (Urdu)
- Interactive map of Azad Jammu and Kashmir
- Coordinates: 33°50′36″N 73°51′05″E
- Administered by: Pakistan
- Established (Azad Kashmir Day): 24 October 1947; 79 years ago
- Capital and largest city: Muzaffarabad
- Administrative Divisions: 3: Mirpur; Muzaffarabad; Poonch

Government
  - Type: Nominally self-governing parliamentary republic under a federal parliamentary republic
  - Body: Government of Azad Kashmir
  - President: Muhammad Najeeb Naqi Khan
  - Prime Minister: Iftikhar Gilani
  - Chief Secretary: Dawood Muhammad Barech (BPS-21 PAS)
  - Legislature: Azad Jammu and Kashmir Legislative Assembly

Area
  - Total: 13,297 km^{2} (5,134 sq mi)

Population (2023 census)
  - Total: ▲4,333,467
  - Density: 304.23/km^{2} (788.0/sq mi)
- Demonym: Azad Kashmiri
- Time zone: UTC+05:00 (PKT)
- ISO 3166 code: PK-AJK
- Official languages: Urdu; English
- Spoken languages: Majority: Pahari-Pothwari; Hindko; Other: Gojri; Kashmiri; Pashto
- Literacy rate (2020–2021): 91.34%
- HDI (2017): ▲0.811 very high (2nd) (Note: Within Pakistan, AJK ranks 2nd-highest in HDI after Islamabad Capital Territory (0.875).)
- Divisions: 3
- Districts: 10
- Tehsils: 32
- Union Councils: 183
- Website: www.ajk.gov.pk

Azad Jammu and Kashmir (Urdu: آزاد جموں و کشمیر, romanised: Āzād Jammū̃ o Kaśmīr, lit. 'Free Jammu and Kashmir'), abbreviated as AJK and colloquially referred to as simply Azad Kashmir (/ˌɑːzæd kæʃˈmɪər/ AH-zad kash-MEER), is a region administered by Pakistan as a nominally self-governing entity and constituting the western portion of the larger Kashmir region, which has been the subject of a dispute between India and Pakistan since 1947. On its eastern side, Azad Kashmir is separated from the Indian-administered territory of Jammu and Kashmir by the Line of Control (LoC), which serves as the de facto border between the Indian and Pakistani-controlled parts of Kashmir. Azad Kashmir borders with the Pakistani-administered Gilgit–Baltistan to the north; it shares borders with the Pakistani provinces of Punjab and Khyber Pakhtunkhwa to the south and west, respectively. Geographically, it covers a total area of 13,297 km^{2} (5,134 sq mi) and has a total population of over 4.33 million as per the 2023 national census.

The territory has a parliamentary form of government modelled after the British Westminster system, with the city of Muzaffarabad serving as its capital. The President of AJK is the constitutional head of state, while the Prime Minister, supported by a Council of Ministers, is the chief executive. The unicameral Azad Kashmir Legislative Assembly elects both the Prime Minister and President. The territory has its own Supreme Court and a High Court, while the Government of Pakistan's Ministry of Kashmir Affairs and Gilgit-Baltistan serves as a link between itself and Azad Jammu and Kashmir's government, although the autonomous territory is not represented in the Parliament of Pakistan.

Northern Azad Kashmir lies in a region that experiences strong vibrations of the earth as a result of the Indian plate underthrusting the Eurasian plate. A major earthquake in 2005 killed at least 100,000 people and left another three million people displaced, causing widespread devastation to the region's infrastructure and economy. Since then, with help from the Government of Pakistan and foreign aid, reconstruction of infrastructure is underway. Azad Kashmir's economy largely depends on agriculture, services, tourism, and remittances sent by members of the British Mirpuri community. Nearly 87% of Azad Kashmiri households own farm property, and the region has the highest rate of school enrolment in Pakistan and a literacy rate of approximately 74%.

== Name ==
Azad Kashmir (Free Kashmir) was the title of a pamphlet issued by the Muslim Conference party at its 13th general session held in 1945 at Poonch. It is believed to have been a response to the National Conference's Naya Kashmir (New Kashmir) programme. Sources state that it was no more than a compilation of various resolutions passed by the party. But its intent seems to have been to declare that the Muslims of Jammu and Kashmir were committed to the Muslim League's struggle for a separate homeland (Pakistan), and that the Muslim Conference was the sole representative organisation of the Muslims of Kashmir. However, the following year, the party passed an "Azad Kashmir resolution" demanding that the maharaja institute a constituent assembly elected on an extended franchise. According to scholar Chitralekha Zutshi, the organisation's declared goal was to achieve responsible government under the aegis of the maharaja without association with either India or Pakistan. The following year, the party workers assembled at the house of Sardar Ibrahim on 19 July 1947, reversed the decision, demanding that the Maharaja accede to Pakistan.

Soon afterward, Sardar Ibrahim escaped to Pakistan and led the Poonch rebellion from there, with the assistance of Pakistan's prime minister Liaquat Ali Khan and other officials. Liaquat Ali Khan appointed a committee headed by Mian Iftikharuddin to draft a "declaration of freedom". On 4 October, an Azad Kashmir provisional government was declared in Lahore with Ghulam Nabi Gilkar as president under the assumed name "Mr. Anwar" and Sardar Ibrahim as the prime minister. Gilkar travelled to Srinagar and was arrested by the maharaja's government. Pakistani officials subsequently appointed Sardar Ibrahim as the president of the provisional government. (Note: The official with direct involvement in the affair was the Commissioner of Rawalpindi Division, Khawaja Abdul Rahim. He was assisted by Nasim Jahan, the wife of Colonel Akbar Khan.)

== History ==
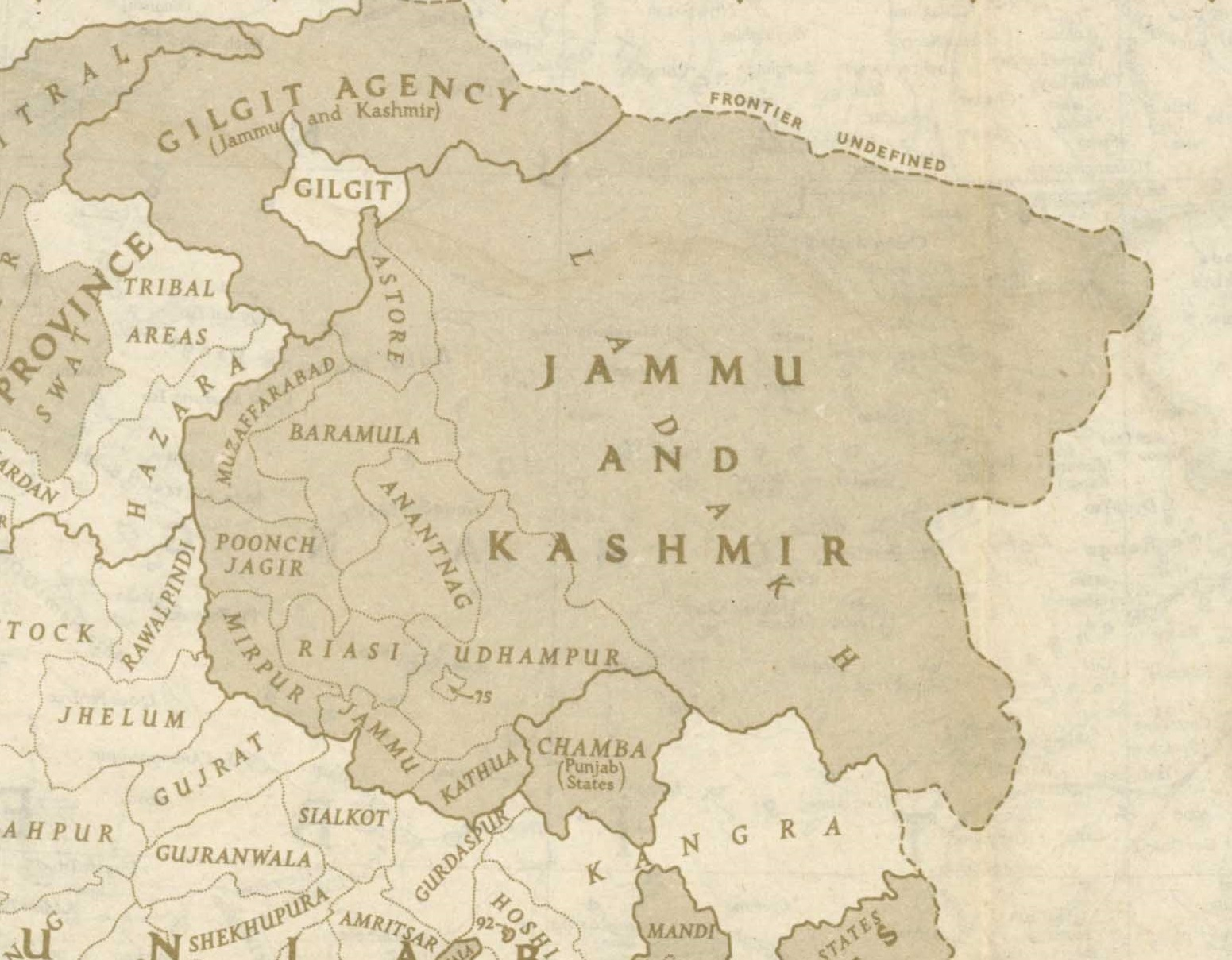
A 1946 map of the princely state of Jammu and Kashmir; present-day Azad Kashmir constitutes areas of the three western-most districts

At the time of the Partition of India in 1947, the British abandoned their suzerainty over the princely states, which were left with the options of joining India or Pakistan or remaining independent. Hari Singh, the maharaja of Jammu and Kashmir, wanted his state to remain independent. Muslims in the western districts of the Jammu province (current day Azad Kashmir) and in the Frontier Districts province (current day Gilgit-Baltistan) had wanted to join Pakistan.

In Spring 1947, an uprising against the maharaja broke out in Poonch, an area bordering the Rawalpindi division of West Punjab. The maharaja's administration is said to have started levying punitive taxes on the peasantry which provoked a local revolt and the administration resorted to brutal suppression. The area's population, swelled by recently demobilised soldiers following World War II, rebelled against the maharaja's forces and gained control of almost the entire district. Following this victory, the pro-Pakistan chieftains of the western districts of Muzaffarabad, Poonch and Mirpur proclaimed a provisional Azad Jammu and Kashmir government in Rawalpindi on 3 October 1947. (Note: Officially, the Mirpur and Poonch districts were in the Jammu province of the state and Muzaffarabad was in the Kashmir province. All three provinces spoke languages related to Punjabi, not the Kashmiri language spoken in the Kashmir Valley.) Ghulam Nabi Gilkar, under the assumed name "Mr. Anwar," issued a proclamation in the name of the provisional government in Muzaffarabad. However, this government quickly fizzled out with the arrest of Anwar in Srinagar. On 24 October, a second provisional government of Azad Kashmir was established at Palandri under the leadership of Sardar Ibrahim Khan.

On 21 October, several thousand Pashtun tribesmen from North-West Frontier Province poured into Jammu and Kashmir to help with the rebellion against the maharaja's rule. They were led by experienced military leaders and were equipped with modern arms. The maharaja's crumbling forces were unable to withstand the onslaught. The tribesmen captured the towns of Muzaffarabad and Baramulla, the latter of which is 32 kilometres (20 mi) northwest of the state capital Srinagar. On 24 October, the Maharaja requested military assistance from India, which responded that it was unable to help him unless he acceded to India. Accordingly, on 26 October 1947, Maharaja Hari Singh signed an Instrument of Accession, handing over control of defence, external affairs, and communications to the Government of India in return for military aid. Indian troops were immediately airlifted into Srinagar. Pakistan intervened subsequently. Fighting ensued between the Indian and Pakistani armies, with the two areas of control more or less stabilised around what is now known as the "Line of Control".

India later approached the United Nations, asking it to resolve the dispute, and resolutions were passed in favour of the holding of a plebiscite with regard to Kashmir's future. However, no such plebiscite has ever been held on either side, since there was a precondition that required the withdrawal of the Pakistani army along with the non-state elements and the subsequent partial withdrawal of the Indian army from the parts of Kashmir under their respective control – a withdrawal that never took place. In 1949, a formal cease-fire line separating the Indian- and Pakistani-controlled parts of Kashmir came into effect.

Following the 1949 cease-fire agreement with India, the government of Pakistan divided the northern and western parts of Kashmir that it controlled at the time of the cease-fire into the following two separately controlled political entities:

- Azad Jammu and Kashmir (AJK) – the narrow, southern part, 400 km (250 mi) long, with a width varying from 15 to 65 km (10 to 40 mi).
- Gilgit–Baltistan formerly called the Federally Administered Northern Areas (FANA) – the much larger political entity to the north of AJK with an area of 72,496 km^{2} (27,991 sq mi).

In 1955, the Poonch uprising broke out. It was largely concentrated in areas of Rawalakot as well as the rest of Poonch Division. It ended in 1956.

In 1970, Yahya Khan's military administration promulgated a 'rudimentary' constitution, 'The Azad Jammu and Kashmir Government Act, 1970' which provided AJK a presidential system, an elected legislative assembly and 'considerable' autonomy. Snedden refers to it as having "delivered the most autonomy ever enjoyed by this region – or by any region in J&K." The central government only controlling foreign affairs, defence and currency, while the MKA was sidelined.

Zulfikar Ali Bhutto, then Prime-Minister of Pakistan, with some local support imposed the 'Azad Jammu and Kashmir Interim Constitution Act, 1974’ (Interim till the Kashmir dispute was resolved with India). It allowed AJK a directly elected AJK Legislative Assembly, and a smaller indirectly elected Azad Jammu and Kashmir Council in Islamabad. This arrangement reduced the power of the MKA, however Snedden referred to it as a "diminution."

Danish Khan in The Friday Times characterises this development as providing "an avenue for citizens to draw attention from political elites towards immediate socio-economic and developmental concerns such as access to basic infrastructure and public goods," further stating "while public sector investments in infrastructure and social sectors have shown relative improvements over the years, the overarching narrative in the political sphere, spanning across party lines, remains heavily focused on the Jammu & Kashmir conflict rather than indigenous socio-economic development."

The Constitution provides Kashmir its own President, Prime-Minister, High Court, Supreme Court, Auditor General and Chief Election Commissioner as well. The 13th Amendment to the AJK Constitution, passed in Muzaffarabad empowered the AJK government, increased the powers of the elected assembly, granted Azad Kashmir greater financial and administrative powers and sought to make the federal territory more autonomous. The word "Act" was also deleted from the Constitution.

At one time under Pakistani control, Kashmir's Shaksgam tract, a small region along the northeastern border of Gilgit–Baltistan, was provisionally ceded by Pakistan to the People's Republic of China in 1963 which helped in resolving China-Pakistan boundary dispute and now the forms part of China's Xinjiang Uygur Autonomous Region.

In 1972, the then current border between the Indian and Pakistani controlled parts of Kashmir was designated as the "Line of Control". This line has remained unchanged since the 1972 Simla Agreement, which bound the two countries "to settle their differences by peaceful means through bilateral negotiations". Some political experts claim that, in view of that pact, the only solution to the issue is mutual negotiation between the two countries without involving a third party such as the United Nation. The 1974 Interim Constitution Act was passed by the 48-member Azad Jammu and Kashmir unicameral assembly.

In April 1997, the Nawaz Sharif government refused to grant constitutional status to Azad Jammu and Kashmir stating that "'The grant of constitutional rights to these people will amount to unilateral annexation of these areas."

== Geography ==
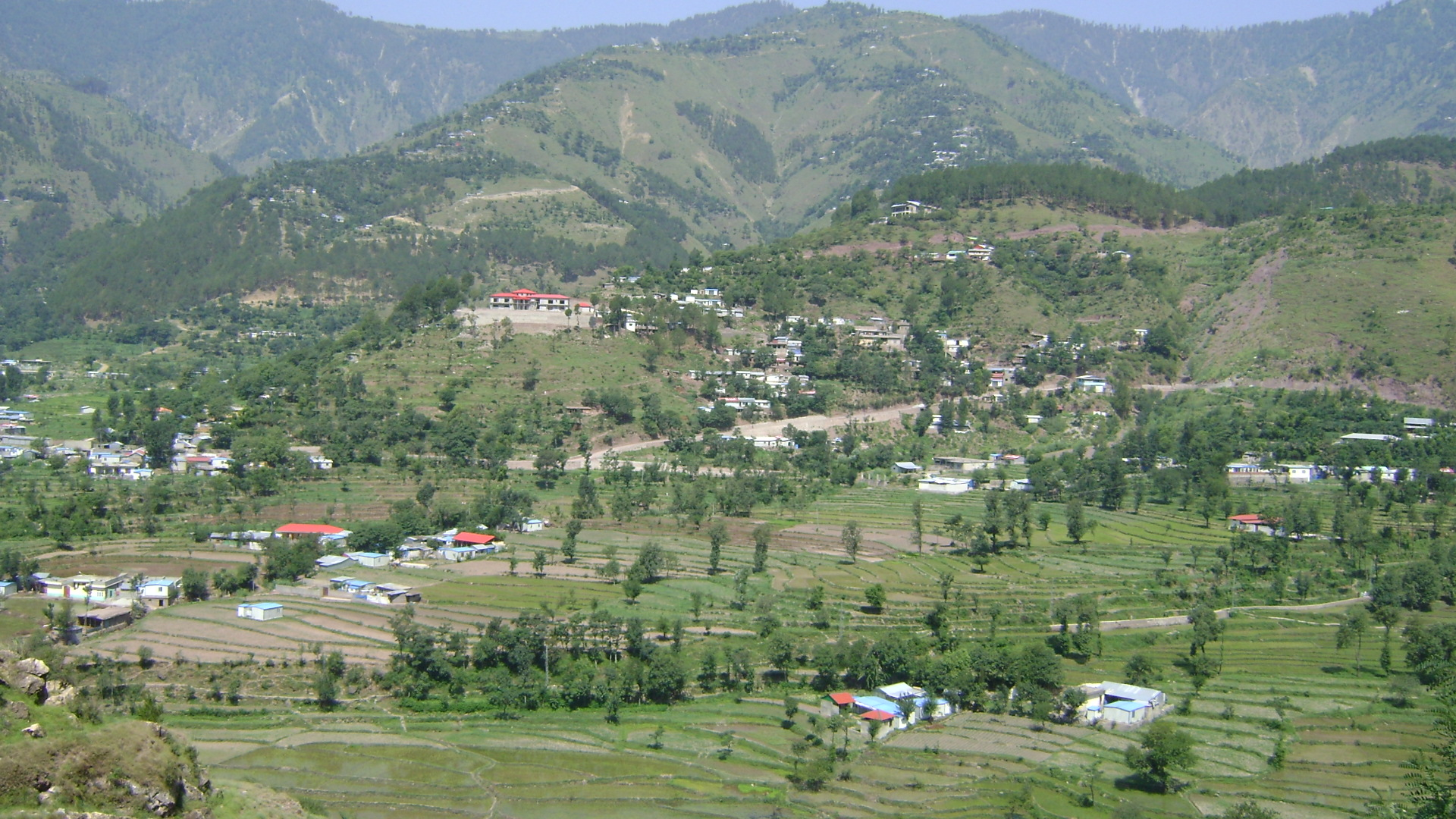
Landscape of Azad Kashmir

The northern part of Azad Jammu and Kashmir encompasses the lower area of the Himalayas, including Jamgarh Peak (4,734 m or 15,531 ft). However, Sarwali Peak (6326 m) in Neelum Valley is the highest peak in the state.

The region receives rainfall in both the winter and the summer. Muzaffarabad and Pattan are among the wettest areas of Pakistan. Throughout most of the region, the average rainfall exceeds 1400 mm, with the highest average rainfall occurring near Muzaffarabad (around 1800 mm). During the summer season, monsoon floods of the rivers Jhelum and Leepa are common due to extreme rains and snow melting.

=== Climate ===
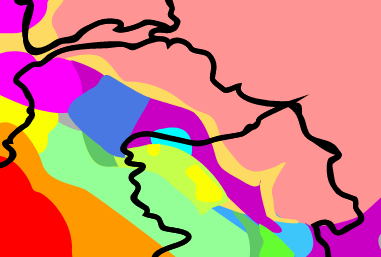
Map of the Köppen-Geiger climate classification

The southern parts of Azad Kashmir, including the Bhimber, Mirpur, and Kotli districts, have extremely hot weather in the summer and moderate cold weather in the winter. They receive rain mostly in monsoon weather.

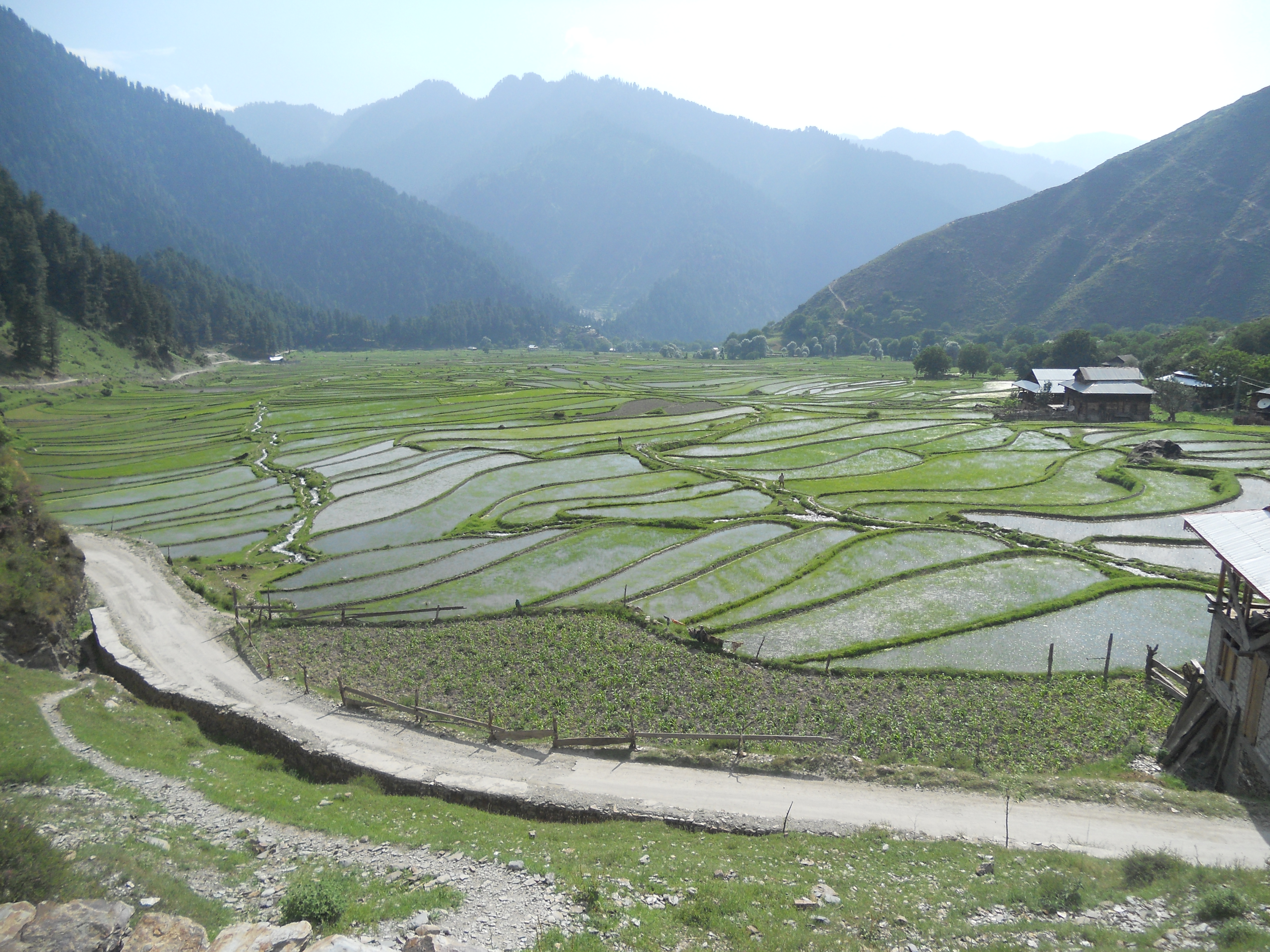
Paddy field in Leepa valley

In the central and northern parts of the state, the weather remains moderately hot in the summer and cold and chilly in the winter. Snowfall also occurs there in December and January.

The region receives rainfall in both the winter and the summer. Muzaffarabad and Pattan are among the wettest areas of the state, but they don't receive snow. Throughout most of the region, the average rainfall exceeds 1400 mm, with the highest average rainfall occurring near Muzaffarabad (around 1800 mm). During summer, monsoon floods of the Jhelum and Leepa rivers are common, due to high rainfall and melting snow.

== Government and politics ==
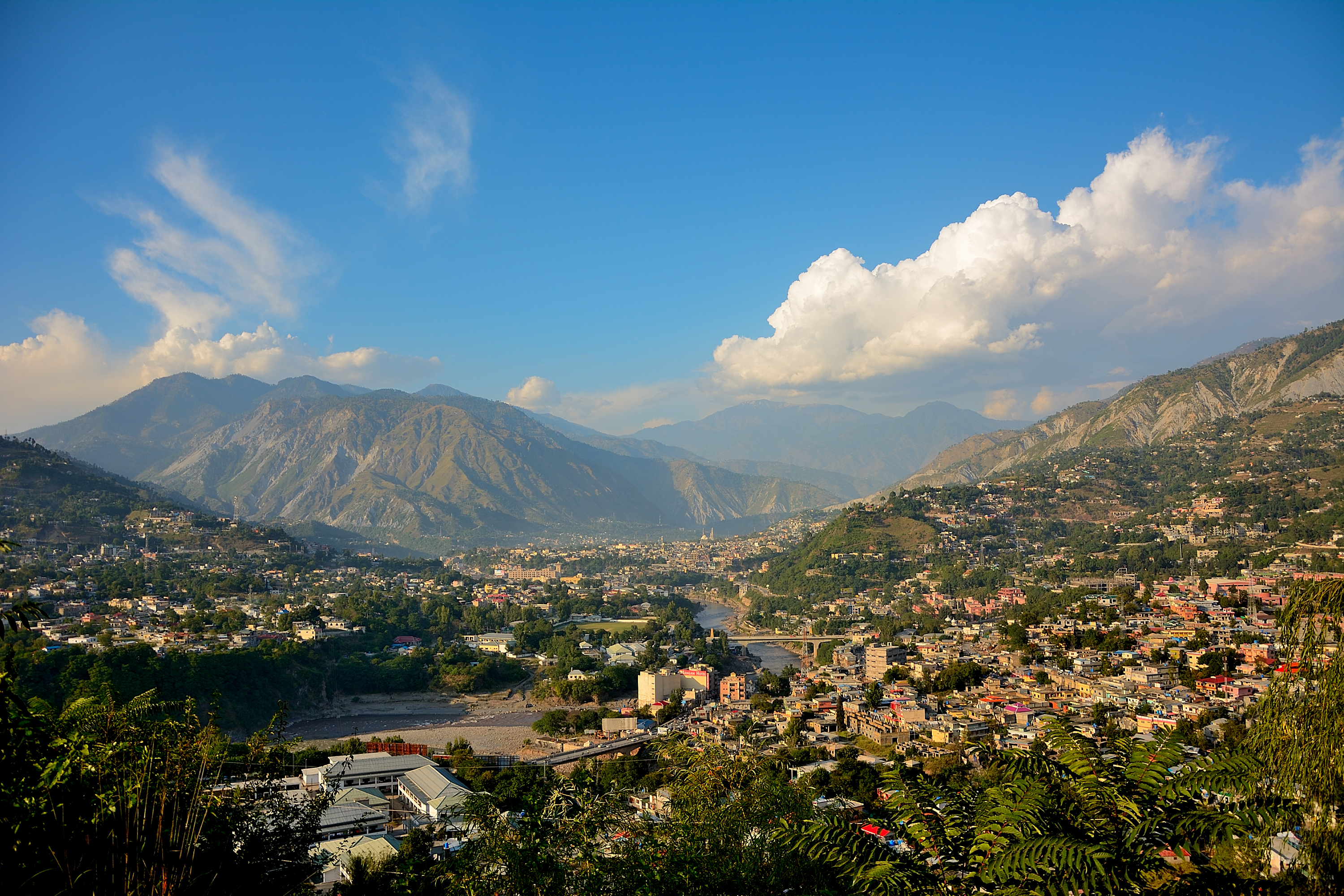
Muzaffarabad, the capital city of Muzaffarabad District and Azad Kashmir

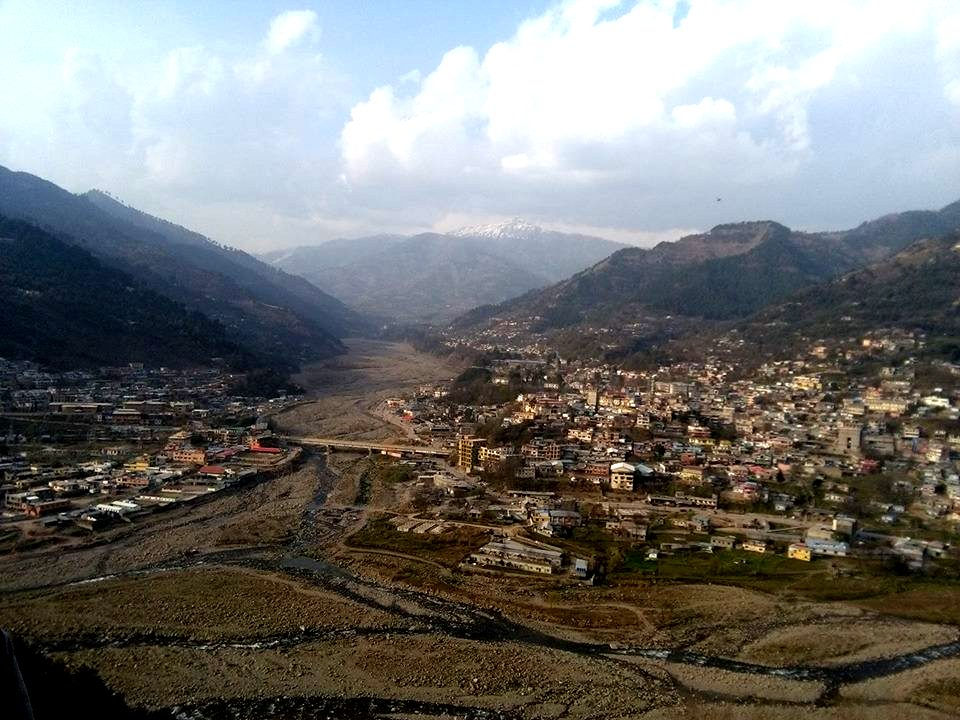
Bagh, the capital city of Bagh District

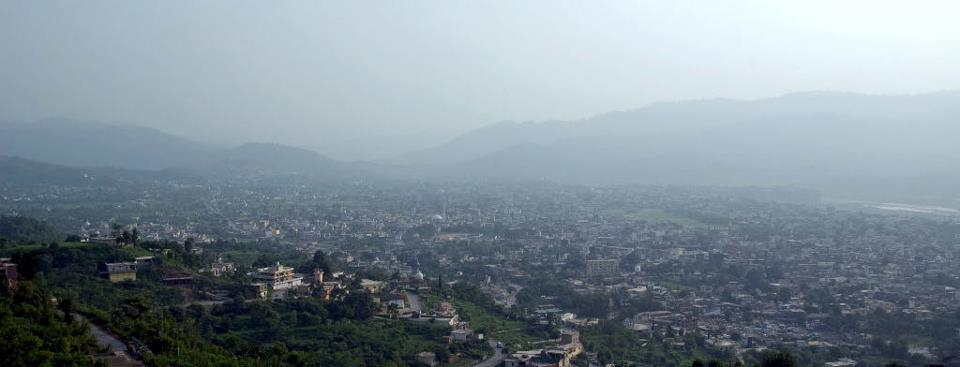
Mirpur, the capital city of Mirpur District

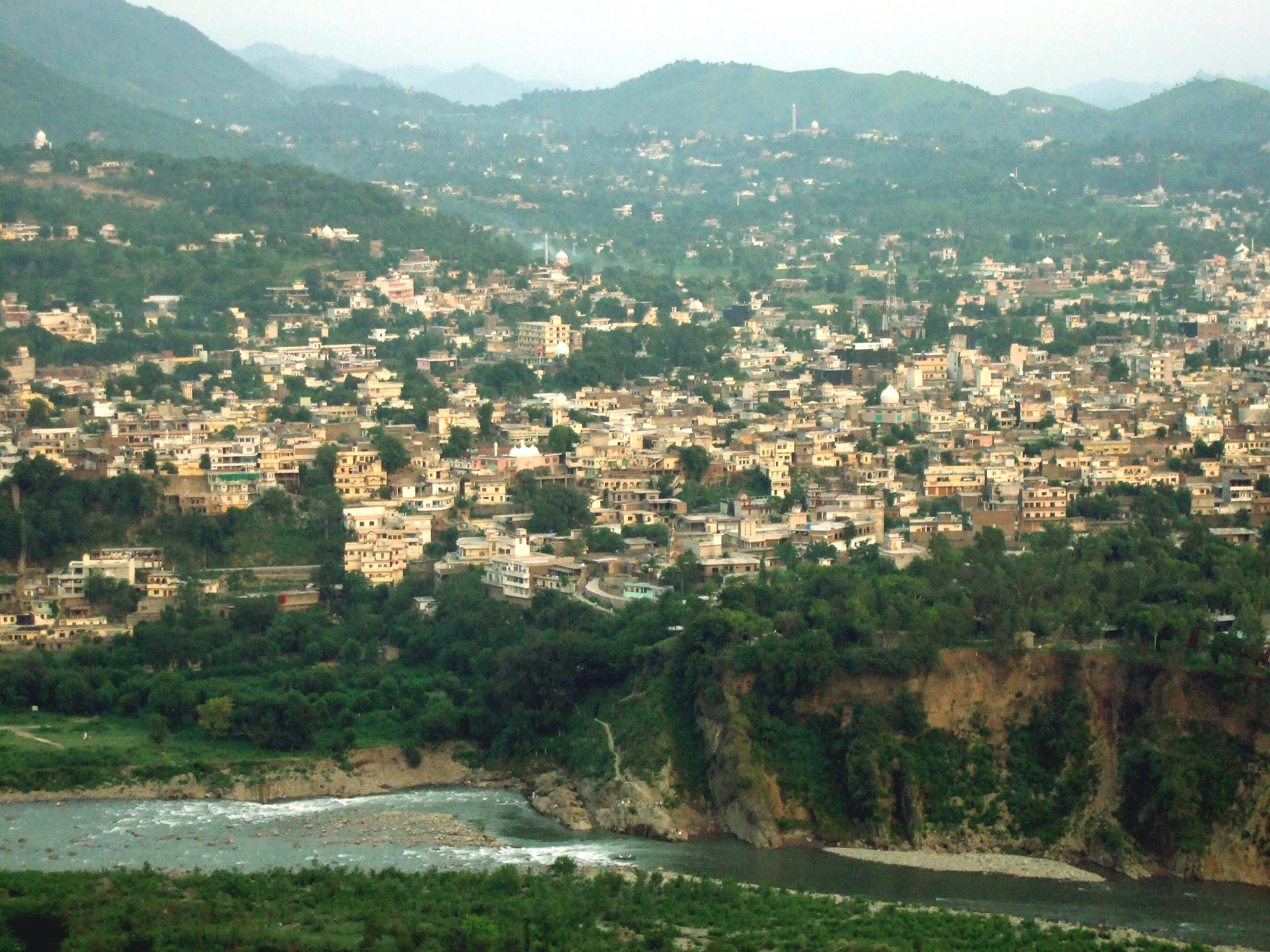
Kotli, the capital city of Kotli District

Azad Jammu and Kashmir (AJK) is nominally a self-governing state, but ever since the 1949 ceasefire between Indian and Pakistani forces, Pakistan has exercised control over the state without incorporating it into Pakistan. Azad Kashmir has its own elected president, prime minister, legislative assembly, high court, and official flag.

Azad Kashmir's budget and tax affairs, are dealt with by the Azad Jammu and Kashmir Council rather than by Pakistan's Central Board of Revenue. The Azad Jammu and Kashmir Council is a supreme body consisting of 14 members, 8 from the government of Azad Jammu and Kashmir and 6 from the government of Pakistan. Its chairman/chief executive is the prime minister of Pakistan. Other members of the council are the president and the prime minister of Azad Kashmir (or an individual nominated by her/him) and 6 members of the AJK Legislative Assembly. Azad Kashmir Day is celebrated in Azad Jammu and Kashmir on 24 October, which is the day that the Azad Jammu and Kashmir government was created in 1947. Pakistan has celebrated Kashmir Solidarity Day on 5 February of each year since 1990 as a day of protest against India's sovereignty over its State of Jammu and Kashmir. That day is a national holiday in Pakistan. Pakistan observes the Kashmir Accession Day as Black Day on 27 October of each year since 1947 as a day of protest against the accession of Jammu and Kashmir State to India and its military presence in the Indian-controlled parts of Jammu and Kashmir.

Brad Adams, the Asia director at the U.S.-based NGO Human Rights Watch said in 2006: "Although 'azad' means 'free,' the residents of Azad Kashmir are anything but; the Pakistani authorities govern the Azad Kashmir government with tight controls on basic freedoms." Scholar Christopher Snedden has observed that despite tight controls, the people of Azad Kashmir have generally accepted whatever Pakistan has done to them, which in any case has varied little from how most Pakistanis have been treated (by Pakistan). According to Christopher Snedden, one of the reasons for this was that the people of Azad Kashmir had always wanted to be part of Pakistan.

Consequently, having little to fear from a pro-Pakistan population devoid of options, Pakistan imposed its will through the Federal Ministry of Kashmir Affairs and failed to empower the people of Azad Kashmir, allowing genuine self-government for only a short period in the 1970s. According to the interim constitution that was drawn up in the 1970s, the only political parties that are allowed to exist are those that pay allegiance to Pakistan: "No person or political party in Azad Jammu and Kashmir shall be permitted... activities prejudicial or detrimental to the State's accession to Pakistan." The pro-independence Jammu and Kashmir Liberation Front has never been allowed to contest elections in Azad Kashmir. While the interim constitution does not give them a choice, the people of Azad Kashmir have not considered any option other than joining Pakistan. Except in a legal sense, Azad Kashmir has been fully integrated into Pakistan.

Azad Kashmir is home to a vibrant civil society. One of the organisations active in the territory and inside Pakistan is YFK-International Kashmir Lobby Group, an NGO that seeks better India-Pakistan relations through conflict resolution in Kashmir.

=== Development project ===
According to the project report by the Asian Development Bank, the bank has set out development goals for Azad Kashmir in the areas of health, education, nutrition, and social development. The whole project is estimated to cost US$76 million. Germany, between 2006 and 2014, has also donated $38 million towards the AJK Health Infrastructure Programme.

=== Administrative divisions ===
Districts of Azad Kashmir

The state is administratively divided into three divisions which, in turn, are divided into ten districts.

Division	District	Area (km^{2})	Population (2017 Census)	Headquarters
Mirpur	Mirpur	1,010	441,784	New Mirpur City
Mirpur	Kotli	1,862	804,265	Kotli
Mirpur	Bhimber	1,516	438,994	Bhimber
Muzaffarabad	Muzaffarabad	1,642	703,661	Muzaffarabad
Muzaffarabad	Hattian	854	257,059	Hattian Bala
Muzaffarabad	Neelam Valley	3,621	221,512	Athmuqam
Poonch	Poonch	855	544,898	Rawalakot
Poonch	Haveli	600	170,828	Forward Kahuta
Poonch	Bagh	768	436,795	Bagh
Poonch	Sudhanoti	569	313,671	Palandri
Total: 3	10	13,297	4,333,467	

=== Human rights abuses ===
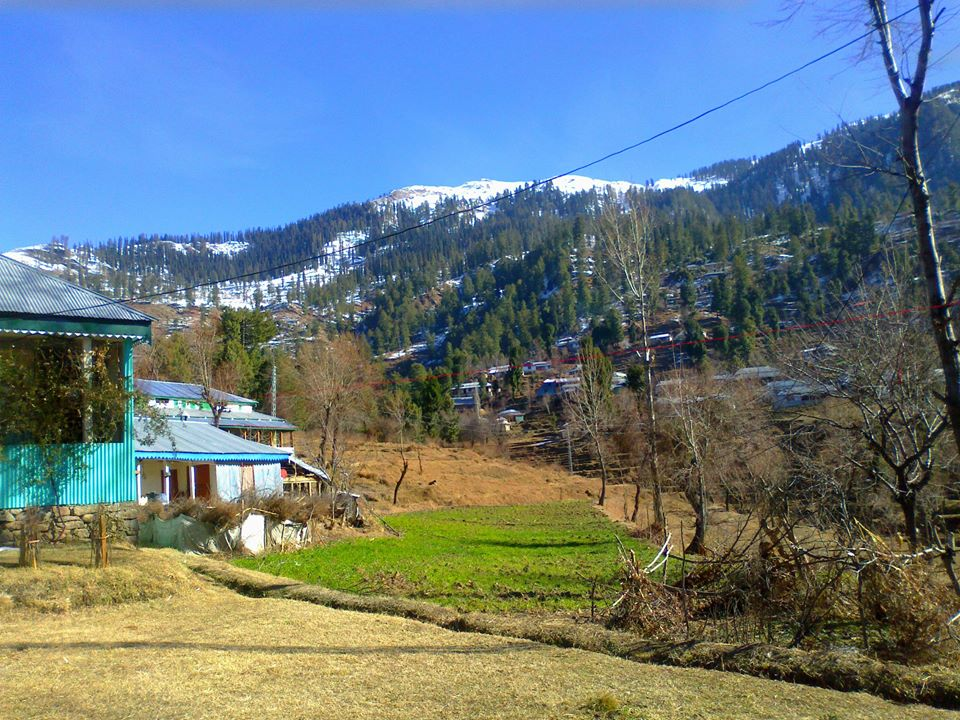
Kotla, Bagh District

== Demographics ==
=== Population ===
The population of Azad Kashmir, according to the preliminary results of 2023 Pakistani census, is 4.33 million. The website of the AJK government reports the literacy rate to be 74%, with the enrolment rate in primary school being 98% and 90% for boys and girls respectively.

The population of Azad Kashmir is almost entirely Muslim. The people of this region culturally differ from the Kashmiris living in the Kashmir Valley of Jammu and Kashmir and are closer to the culture of Pir Panjal Region. Mirpur, Kotli, and Bhimber are all old towns of the Jammu region.

=== Religion ===
Azad Jammu and Kashmir has an almost entirely Muslim population. According to data maintained by Christian community organisations, there are around 4,500 Christian residents in the region. Bhimber is home to most of them, followed by Mirpur and Muzaffarabad. A few dozen families also live in Kotli, Poonch, and Bagh. However, the Christian community has been struggling to get residential status and property rights in AJK.

There is no official data on the total number of Baháʼí Faith adherents in AJK. Only six Baháʼí families are known to be living in Muzaffarabad with others living in rural areas.

The followers of the Ahmadi faith are estimated to be somewhere between 20,000 and 25,000, and most of them live in Kotli, Mirpur, Bhimber, and Muzaffarabad.

Religious groups in Azad Jammu and Kashmir (Jammu & Kashmir Princely State era)
Religious group	1891		1901		1911		1921		1931		1941	
Religious group	Pop.	%	Pop.	%	Pop.	%	Pop.	%	Pop.	%	Pop.	%
Islam	659,265	86.87%	747,426	85.62%	749,945	87.76%	780,607	88.02%	850,135	87.68%	939,460	87.54%
Hinduism	92,639	12.21%	108,331	12.41%	84,130	9.85%	81,733	9.22%	87,554	9.03%	93,559	8.72%
Sikhism	6,918	0.91%	17,132	1.96%	20,391	2.39%	24,491	2.76%	31,709	3.27%	39,910	3.72%
Jainism	64	0.01%	0	0%	8	0%	6	0%	11	0%	0	0%
Christianity	21	0%	18	0%	55	0.01%	24	0%	168	0.02%	136	0.01%
Buddhism	0	0%	0	0%	2	0%	0	0%	0	0%	0	0%
Zoroastrianism	0	0%	0	0%	0	0%	0	0%	1	0%	0	0%
Tribal	0	0%	—N/a	—N/a	—N/a	—N/a	—N/a	—N/a	0	0%	0	0%
Judaism	—N/a	—N/a	—N/a	—N/a	—N/a	—N/a	—N/a	—N/a	—N/a	—N/a	0	0%
Others	0	0%	8	0%	0	0%	0	0%	0	0%	89	0.01%
Total population	758,907	100%	872,915	100%	854,531	100%	886,861	100%	969,578	100%	1,073,154	100%
Note1: 1891 & 1901 figures taken from census data by combining the total population of two districts (Bhimber and Muzaffarabad) and one Jagir (Poonch) in the Princely State of Jammu and Kashmir that ultimately would be administered by Pakistan, in the contemporary self-administrative territory of Azad Jammu and Kashmir. Note2: 1911–1941 figures taken from census data by combining the total population of two districts (Mirpur and Muzaffarabad) and one Jagir (Poonch) in the Princely State of Jammu and Kashmir that ultimately would be administered by Pakistan, in the contemporary self-administrative territory of Azad Jammu and Kashmir.

=== Ethnic groups ===
Christopher Snedden writes that most of the native residents of Azad Kashmir are not of Kashmiri ethnicity; rather, they could be called "Jammuites" due to their historical and cultural links with that region, which is coterminous with neighbouring Punjab and Hazara. Because their region was formerly a part of the princely state of Jammu and Kashmir and is named after it, many Azad Kashmiris have adopted the "Kashmiri" identity, whereas in an ethnolinguistic context, the term "Kashmiri" would ordinarily refer to natives of the Kashmir Valley region. The population of Azad Kashmir has strong historical, cultural and linguistic affinities with the neighbouring populations of upper Punjab and Potohar region of Pakistan, whereas the Sudhans have the oral tradition of Pashtuns.

The main communities living in this region are:

- Gujjars – They are an agricultural tribe and are estimated to be the largest community living in the ten districts of Azad Kashmir. They are estimated to number around 800,000.
- Sudhans – (also known as Sadozai, Sardar) are the second largest tribe, inhabiting mainly the districts of Poonch, Sudhanoti, Bagh, and Kotli in Azad Kashmir. They allegedly originated from Pashtun areas. Their population numbers over 500,000, and together with the Rajputs they are the source of most of Azad Kashmir's political class.
- Jats – They are one of the larger communities of AJK and primarily inhabit the districts of Mirpur, Bhimber, and Kotli. A large Mirpuri population lives in the U.K. and it is estimated that more people of Mirpuri origins are now residing in the U.K. than in the Mirpur district, which retains strong ties with the U.K. Mirpuri Jats number approximately 300,000.
- Rajputs – They are spread across the territory, and they number a little under 500,000. Together with the Sudhans, they are the source of most of Azad Kashmir's political class.
- Mughals – Largely located in the Bagh and Muzaffarabad districts.
- Awans – A clan with significant numbers in Azad Jammu and Kashmir, living mainly in the Bagh, Poonch, Hattian Bala, and Muzaffarabad. Awans also reside in Punjab and Khyber Pakhtunkhwa in large numbers.
- Dhund – They are a large clan in Azad Jammu and Kashmir and live mostly in the Bagh, Hattian Bala, and Muzaffarabad districts. They also inhabit Abbottabad and upper Potohar Punjab in large numbers.
- Kashmiris – Ethnic Kashmiri populations are found in the Neelam Valley and the Leepa Valley (see Kashmiris in Azad Kashmir).

=== Languages ===
Languages by approximate number of speakers
1. Pahari-Pothwari (68.0%)
2. Gojri (19.0%)
3. Kashmiri (5.00%)
4. Others (8.00%)

The official language of Azad Kashmir is Urdu, (Note: Snedden 2013, p. 176: On p. 29, the census report states that Urdu is the official language of the government of Azad Kashmir, with Kashmiri, Pahari, Gojri, Punjabi, Kohistani, Pushto, and Sheena 'frequently spoken in Azad Kashmir'. Yet, when surveyed about their 'mother tongue', Azad Kashmiris' choices were limited to selecting from Pakistan's major languages: Urdu, Punjabi, Sindhi, Pushto, Balochi, Saraiki, and 'others'; not surprisingly, 2.18 million of Azad Kashmir's 2.97 million people chose 'others'.) while English is used in higher domains. The majority of the population, however, are native speakers of other languages. The foremost among these is Pahari–Pothwari (a dialect of Punjabi) with its various dialects. There are also sizeable communities speaking Kashmiri (mostly in the north), Gujari (throughout the territory), and Dogri (in the south), as well as pockets of speakers of Kundal Shahi, Shina and Pashto. With the exception of Pashto and English, those languages belong to the Indo-Aryan language family.

The dialects of the Pahari-Pothwari (a Punjabic dialect in of itself) language complex cover most of the territory of Azad Kashmir. Those are also spoken across the Line of Control in the neighbouring areas of Indian Jammu and Kashmir and are closely related both to Majhi Punjabi to the south, other Lahnda Punjabi dialects and Hindko to the northwest. The language variety in the southern districts of Azad Kashmir is known by a variety of names – including Mirpuri, Pothwari and Pahari – and is closely related to the Pothwari dialect proper spoken to the east in the Pothohar region of Punjab. The dialects of the central districts of Azad Kashmir are occasionally referred to in the literature as Chibhali or Punchi, but the speakers themselves usually call them Pahari, an ambiguous name that is also used for several unrelated languages of the lower Himalayas. Going north, the speech forms gradually change into Hindko. Today, in the Muzaffarabad District the preferred local name for the language is Hindko, although it is still apparently more closely related to the core dialects of Pahari. Further north in the Neelam Valley the dialect, locally also known as Parmi, can more unambiguously be subsumed under Hindko.

Another major language of Azad Kashmir is Gujari. It is spoken by several hundred thousand (Note: Hallberg & O'Leary (1992, p. 96) report two rough estimates for the total population of Gujari speakers in Azad Kashmir: 200,000 and 700,000, both from the 1980s.) people among the traditionally nomadic Gujars, many of whom are nowadays settled. Not all ethnic Gujars speak Gujari, the proportion of those who have shifted to other languages is probably higher in southern Azad Kashmir. Gujari is most closely related to the Rajasthani languages (particularly Mewati), although it also shares features with Punjabi. It is dispersed over large areas in northern Pakistan and India. Within Pakistan, the Gujari dialects of Azad Kashmir are more similar, in terms of shared basic vocabulary and mutual intelligibility, to the Gujar varieties of the neighbouring Hazara region than to the dialects spoken further to the northwest in Khyber Pakhtunkhwa and north in Gilgit.

There are scattered communities of Kashmiri speakers, notably in the Neelam Valley, where they form the second-largest language group after speakers of Hindko. There have been calls for the teaching of Kashmiri (particularly in order to counter India's claim of promoting the culture of Kashmir), but the limited attempts at introducing the language at the secondary school level have not been successful, and it is Urdu, rather than Kashmiri, that Kashmiri Muslims have seen as their identity symbol. There is an ongoing process of gradual shift to larger local languages, but at least in the Neelam Valley there still exist communities for whom Kashmiri is the sole mother tongue.

There are speakers of Dogri in the southernmost district of Bhimber, where they are estimated to represent almost a third of the district's population. In the northernmost district of Neelam, there are small communities of speakers of several other languages. Shina, which like Kashmiri belongs to the broad Dardic group, is present in two distinct varieties spoken altogether in three villages. Pashto, of the Iranian subgroup and the majority language in the neighbouring province of Khyber Pakhtunkhwa, is spoken in two villages, both situated on the Line of Control. The endangered Kundal Shahi is native to the eponymous village and it is the only language not found outside Azad Kashmir.

== Economy ==
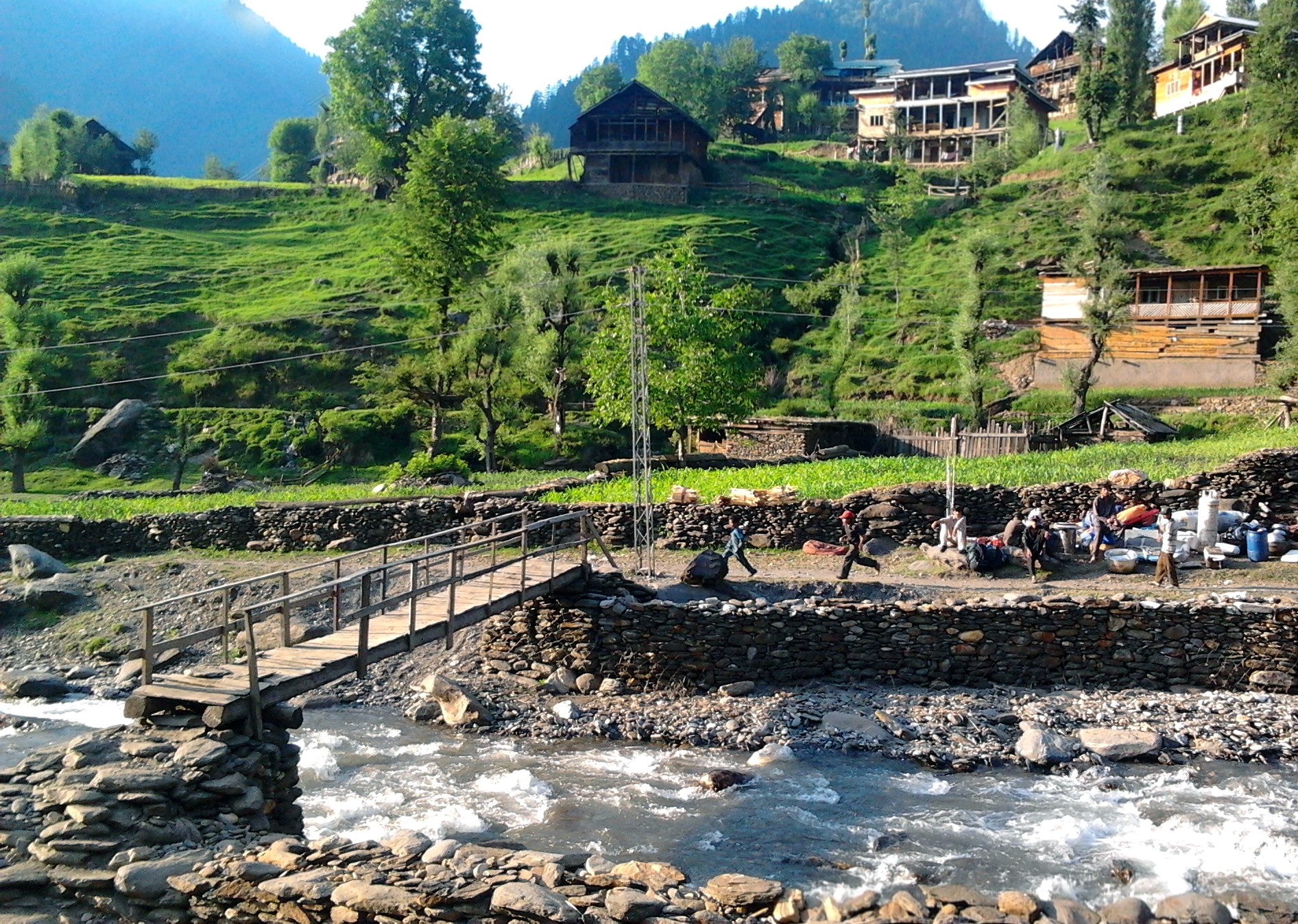
Neelum Valley is a tourist destination in Azad Kashmir.

As of 2021, GDP of Azad Jammu and Kashmir was estimated to be 10 billion pounds, giving per capita an income of £5604. Historically the economy of Azad Kashmir has been agricultural which meant that land was the main source or mean of production. This means that all food for immediate and long-term consumption was produced from the land. The produce included various crops, fruits, vegetables, etc. The land was also the source of other livelihood necessities such as wood, fuel, grazing for animals which then turned into dairy products. Because of this land was also the main source of revenue for the governments whose primary purpose for centuries was to accumulate revenue.

Agriculture is a major part of Azad Kashmir's economy. Low-lying areas that have high populations grow crops like barley, mangoes, millet, corn (maize), and wheat, and also raise cattle. In the elevated areas that are less populated and more spread out, forestry, corn, and livestock are the main sources of income. There are mineral and marble resources in Azad Kashmir close to Mirpur and Muzaffarabad. There are also graphite deposits at Mohriwali. There are also reservoirs of low-grade coal, chalk, bauxite, and zircon. Local household industries produce carved wooden objects, textiles, and dhurrie carpets. There is also an arts and crafts industry that produces such cultural goods as namdas, shawls, pashmina, pherans, Papier-mâché, basketry copper, rugs, wood carving, silk and woolen clothing, patto, carpets, namda gubba, and silverware. Agricultural goods produced in the region include mushrooms, honey, walnuts, apples, cherries, medicinal herbs and plants, resin, deodar, kail, chir, fir, maple, and ash timber.

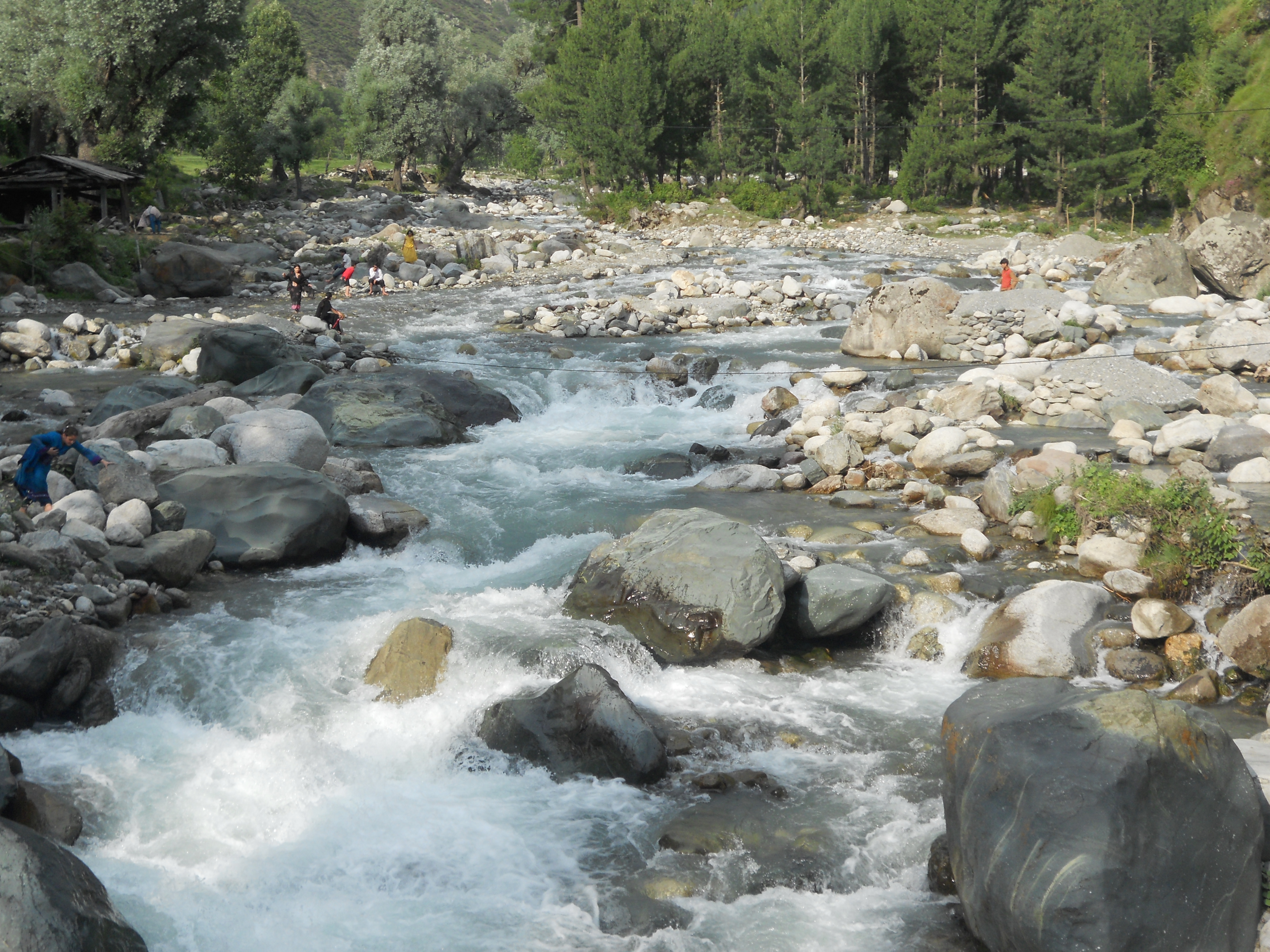
Munda Gali, Leepa Valley

The migration to the UK was accelerated and by the completion of Mangla Dam in 1967 the process of 'chain migration' became in full flow. Today, remittances from British Mirpuri community make a critical role in AJK's economy. In the mid-1950s various economic and social development processes were launched in Azad Kashmir. In the 1960s, with the construction of the Mangla Dam in Mirpur District, the Azad Jammu and Kashmir Government began to receive royalties from the Pakistani government for the electricity that the dam provided to Pakistan. During the mid-2000s, a multibillion-dollar reconstruction began in the aftermath of the 2005 Kashmir earthquake.

In addition to agriculture, textiles, and arts and crafts, remittances have played a major role in the economy of Azad Kashmir. One analyst estimated that the figure for Azad Kashmir was 25.1% in 2001. With regard to annual household income, people living in the higher areas are more dependent on remittances than are those living in the lower areas. In the latter part of 2006, billions of dollars for development were mooted by international aid agencies for the reconstruction and rehabilitation of earthquake-hit zones in Azad Kashmir, though much of that amount was subsequently lost in bureaucratic channels, leading to considerable delays in help getting to the neediest. Hundreds of people continued to live in tents long after the earthquake. A land-use plan for the city of Muzaffarabad was prepared by the Japan International Cooperation Agency.

Tourist destinations in the area include the following:

- Muzaffarabad, the capital city of Azad Kashmir, is located on the banks of the Jhelum and Neelum rivers. It is 138 km (86 mi) from Rawalpindi and Islamabad. Well-known tourist spots near Muzaffarabad are the Red Fort, Pir Chinassi, Patika, Subri Lake and Awan Patti.
- The Neelam Valley is situated to the north and northeast of Muzaffarabad, The gateway to the valley. The main tourist attractions in the valley are Athmuqam, Kutton, Keran, Changan, Sharda, Kel, Arang Kel and Taobat.
- Sudhanoti is one of the ten districts of Azad Kashmir in Pakistan. Sudhanoti is located 90 km (56 mi) away from Islamabad, the Capital of Pakistan. It is connected with Rawalpindi and Islamabad through Azad Pattan road.
- Rawalakot city is the headquarters of Poonch District and is located 122 km (76 mi) from Islamabad. Tourist attractions in Poonch District are Banjosa Lake, Devi Gali, Tatta Pani, and Toli Pir.
- Bagh city, the headquarters of Bagh District, is 205 km (127 mi) from Islamabad and 100 km (62 mi) from Muzaffarabad. The principal tourist attractions in Bagh District are Bagh Fort, Dhirkot, Sudhan Gali, Ganga Lake, Ganga Choti, Kotla Waterfall, Neela Butt, Danna, Panjal Mastan National Park, and Las Danna.
- The Leepa Valley is located 105 km (65 mi) southeast of Muzaffarabad. It is the most charming and scenic place for tourists in Azad Kashmir.
- New Mirpur City is the headquarters of Mirpur District. The main tourist attractions near New Mirpur City are the Mangla Lake and Ramkot Fort.

== Education ==
Mirpur University of Science and Technology

The literacy rate in Azad Kashmir was 62% in 2004, higher than in any other region of Pakistan. The literacy rate of Azad Kashmir was 76.60% in 2018. It remained at 79.80% in 2019. According to the 2020–2021 census, the literacy rate in Azad Kashmir was 91.34%. However, only 2.2% were graduates, compared to the average of 2.9% for Pakistan.

=== Universities ===
The following is a list of universities recognised by Higher Education Commission of Pakistan (HEC):

University	Location(s)	Established	Type	Specialization	Website
Mirpur University of Science and Technology, Mirpur	Mirpur	1980 (2008)*	Public	Engineering & Technology	
University of Azad Jammu and Kashmir	Muzaffarabad	1980	Public	General	
University of Azad Jammu and Kashmir (Neelam Campus)	Neelum	2013	Public	General	
University of Azad Jammu and Kashmir (Jhelum Valley Campus)	Jhelum Valley District	2013	Public	General	
Al-Khair University	Bhimber	1994 (2011*)	Private	General	
Mohi-ud-Din Islamic University	Nerian Sharif	2000	Private	General	
University of Poonch (Rawlakot Campus)	Rawalakot	1980 (2012)*	Public	General	
University of Poonch (SM Campus, Mong, Sudhnoti District)	Sudhnoti District	2014	Public	General	
University of Poonch (Kahuta Campus, Haveli District)	Haveli District	2015	Public	General	
Women University of Azad Jammu and Kashmir Bagh	Bagh	2013	Public	General	
University of Management Sciences and Information Technology	Kotli	2014	Public	General	
Mirpur University of Science and Technology (Bhimber Campus)	Bhimber	2013	Public	Science & Humanities	

* Granted university status.

==== Cadet colleges ====
- Cadet College Palandri
- Cadet College Muzaffarabad
- Cadet College Mirpur

=== Medical colleges ===
The following is a list of undergraduate medical institutions recognised by Pakistan Medical and Dental Council (PMDC) as of 2013.

- Mohtarma Benazir Bhutto Shaheed Medical College in Mirpur
- Azad Jammu Kashmir Medical College in Muzafarabad
- Poonch Medical College in Rawalakot

== Sports ==
Football, cricket, and volleyball are very popular in Azad Kashmir. Many tournaments are also held throughout the year and in the holy month of Ramazan, night-time flood-lit tournaments are also organised.

=== Cricket ===
Azad Kashmir has its own T20 tournament called the Kashmir Premier League, which started in 2021. New Mirpur City has a cricket stadium (Quaid-e-Azam Stadium) which has been taken over by the Pakistan Cricket Board for renovation to bring it up to the international standards. There is also a cricket stadium in Muzaffarabad with a capacity of 8,000 people. This stadium has hosted 8 matches of the Inter-District Under 19 Tournament 2013.

=== Football ===
There are several registered football clubs in Azad Kashmir. Mirpur based Pilot FC competed at the 2005 National Challenge Cup, the top tier cup competition of Pakistan. Rawalakot based Eleven Star has competed in the second-tier PFF League. Other notable football clubs include Youth Football Club, Kashmir National FC, and Azad Super FC.

== Tourism ==
The northern part of Azad Jammu and Kashmir encompasses the lower part of the Himalayas, including Jamgarh Peak (15,531 feet, or 4,734 meters). However, Sarwali peak in the Neelum Valley is the highest peak in the state. Fertile, green, mountainous valleys are characteristic of Azad Kashmir's geography and it is considered one of the most beautiful regions on the subcontinent.

The southern parts of Azad Kashmir including Bhimber, Mirpur and Kotli districts has extremely hot weather in summers and moderate cold weather in winters. It receives rains mostly in monsoon weather.

In the central and northern parts of state weather remains moderate hot in summers and very cold and chilly in winter. Snow fall also occurs there in December and January.

This region receives rainfall in both winters and summers. Muzaffarabad and Pattan are among the wettest areas of the state. Throughout most of the region, the average rainfall exceeds 1400 mm, with the highest average rainfall occurring near Muzaffarabad (around 1800 mm). During summer, monsoon floods of the Jhelum and Leepa river are common, due to high rainfall and melting snow.

== Notable people ==
- Nisaran Abbasi, politician
- Mujahida Hussain Bibi, recipient of Sitara-e-Jurat.
- Maqbool Hussain, recipient of Sitara-e-Jurat.
- Saif Ali Janjua, recipient of Nishan-e-Haider.
- Aziz Khan, 11th Chairman Joint Chief of Staff Committee (CJCSC) of Pakistan Armed Forces.
- Khan Muhammad Khan, politician from Poonch who served as the Chairman of the War Council during the 1947 Poonch Rebellion.
- Muhammad Hayyat Khan, former President of Azad Kashmir.
- Sardar Ibrahim Khan, first and longest-serving President of Azad Kashmir.
- Masood Khan, former President of Azad Kashmir and current Pakistani ambassador to the United States.
- Zaman Khan, cricketer currently playing for the Pakistani national cricket team.
- Khalid Mahmood, British politician and Labour MP for Birmingham Perry Barr.
- Irfan Sabir, Canadian politician and NDP MLA for Calgary-Bhullar-McCall.
- Mohammad Yasin, British politician and Labour MP for Bedford.

== See also ==
- Northern Pakistan
- 1941 Census of Jammu and Kashmir
- Kashmir conflict
- Tourism in Azad Kashmir
- List of cultural heritage sites in Azad Kashmir
