= Keran, Neelum Valley =

Keran کیرن
- Village
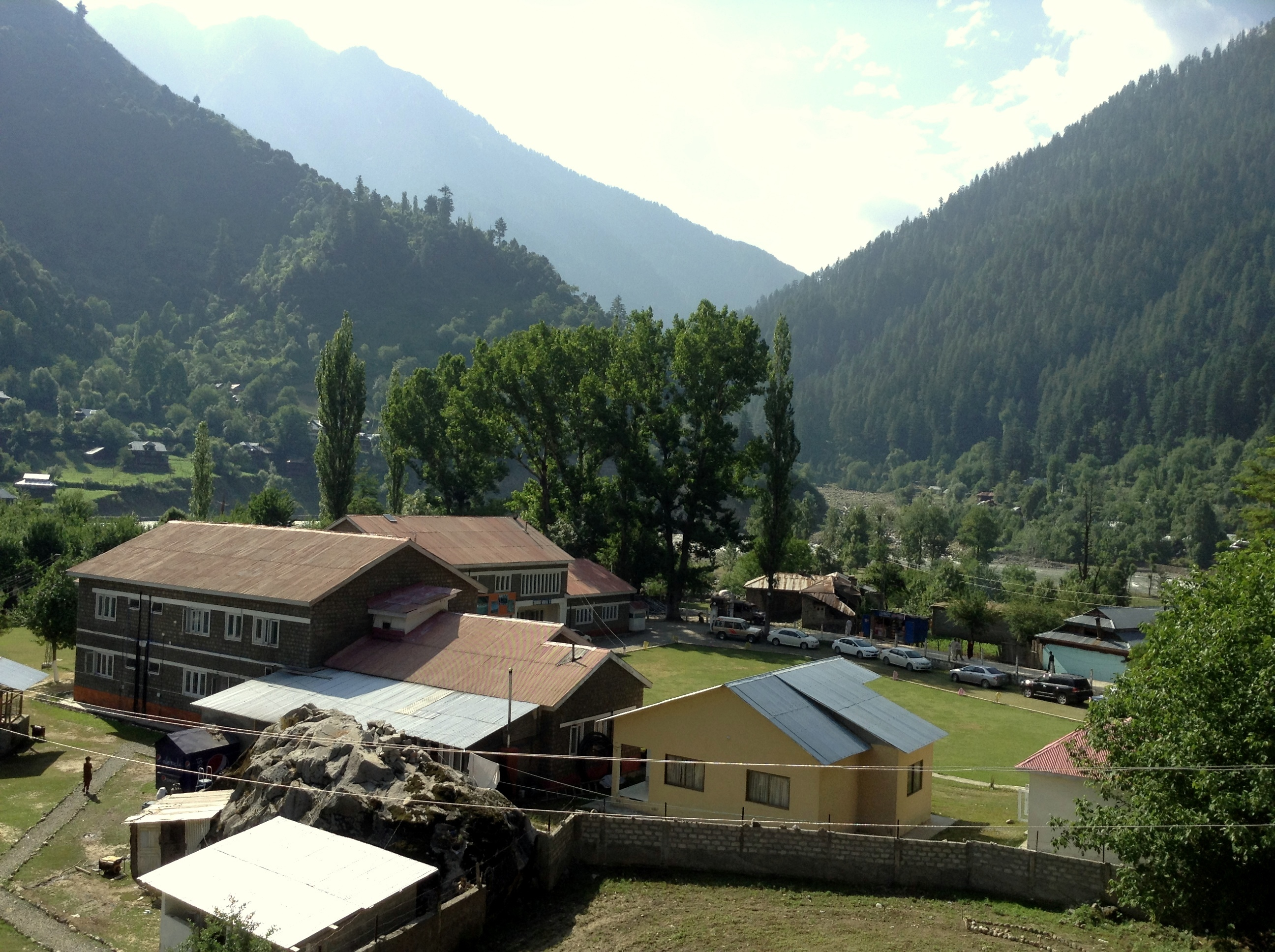

- Location within Azad Kashmir Location within Pakistan
- Coordinates: 34.6653°N 73.9533°E
- Country: Pakistan
- Territory: Azad Kashmir
- Tehsil: Athmuqam
- Elevation: 1,524 m (5,000 ft)

Languages
  - Official: Urdu
- Time zone: PST
- Website: ajktourism.gov.pk/Neelum-Valley

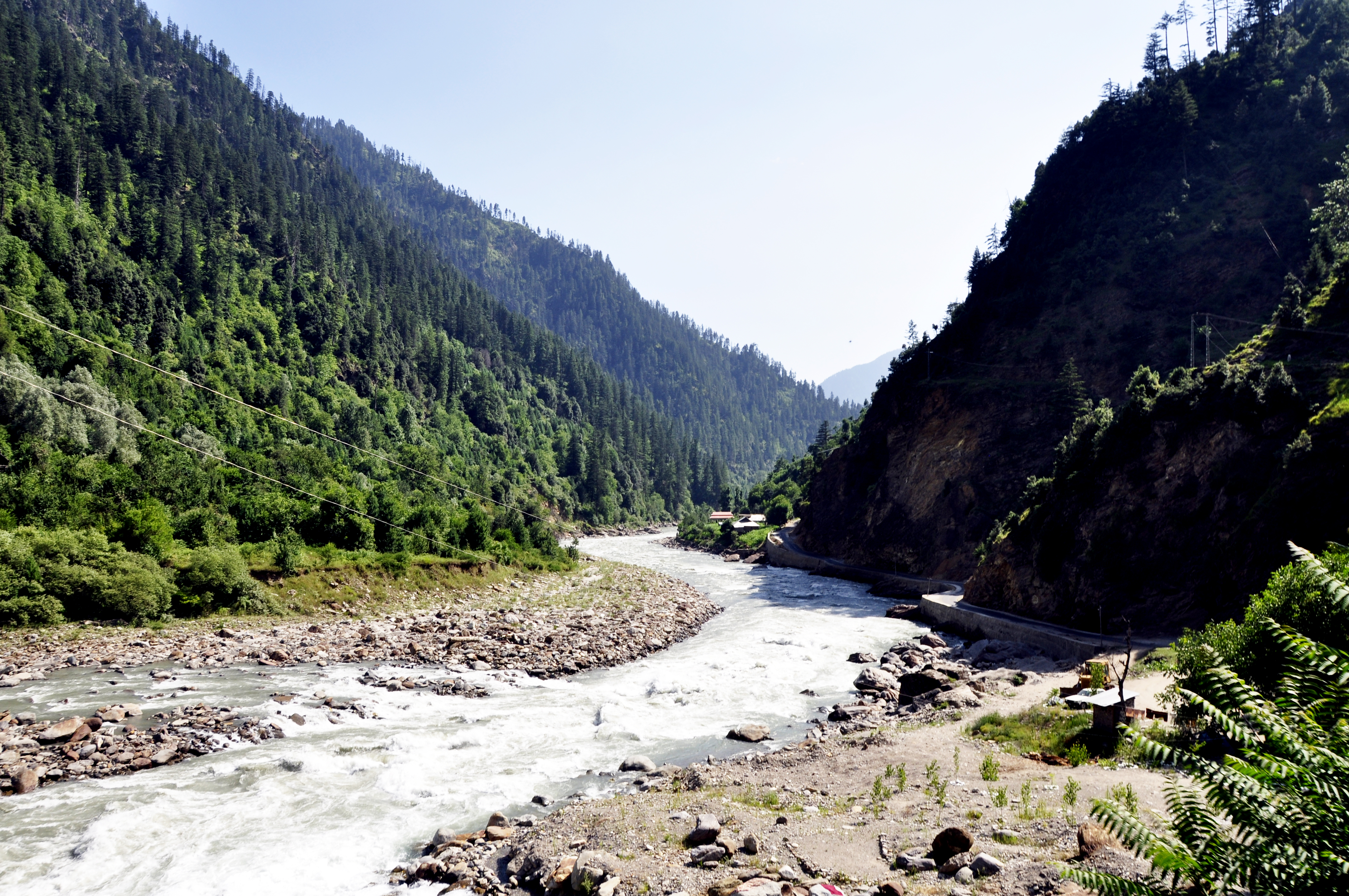
Neelam Valley in Pakistan-administered Azad Jammu and Kashmir(AJK) - also claimed by India.

Keran (Urdu: کیرن) at an altitude of 1,524 meters (5,000 ft), a village and tourist resort in the Neelum Valley on the bank of the Neelum River, is located 93 kilometers (58 mi) from Muzaffarabad in Pakistan-administrated Azad Jammu and Kashmir (AJK). The Neelam village is 2.5 kilometers (1.6 mi) west of Keran. The adjacent village on the other side of the Neelum River in Indian-administered Kashmir is also known as Keran, but there is no border crossing here, and the nearest authorized India-Pakistan crossings or bridges are at Teetwal 45 km to the south.

Keran is accessible by Neelam Valley Road.

== See also ==
- Neelum Valley (Pakistan-administered)
  - Athmuqam, tehsil HQ 12 km north of Keran
  - Dosut, 30 km northeast of Keran
  - Sharda, 38 km northeast of Keran, ancient Hindu pilgrimage site
  - Kel, 54 km northeast of Keran
  - Arang Kel, 55 km northeast of Keran
  - Taobat, 100 km northeast of Keran
- Neelum Valley (India-administered)
  - Keran, Jammu and Kashmir, on the opposite bank of Neelum from Pakistan-administered Keran
