= Women University of Azad Jammu and Kashmir =

Public University

Coordinates: 33.9793°N 73.7773°E

Women University of Azad Jammu and Kashmir Bagh
- Motto: Enter to learn, leave to serve!
- Type: Public
- Established: 25 March 2014; 11 years ago
- Chancellor: Masood Khan President of Azad Jammu and Kashmir
- Vice-Chancellor: Meritorious Prof.Dr Abdul Hamid
- Location: Bagh, Azad Jammu & Kashmir, Pakistan
- Affiliations: PEC, HEC
- Mascot: WUBian
- Website: WUAJK

Women University of Azad Jammu and Kashmir Bagh is a public university located in Bagh, Azad Jammu & Kashmir, Pakistan.
