= Arang Kel =

Village in Azad Kashmir, Pakistan

Arang Kel اڑنگ کیل
- Village
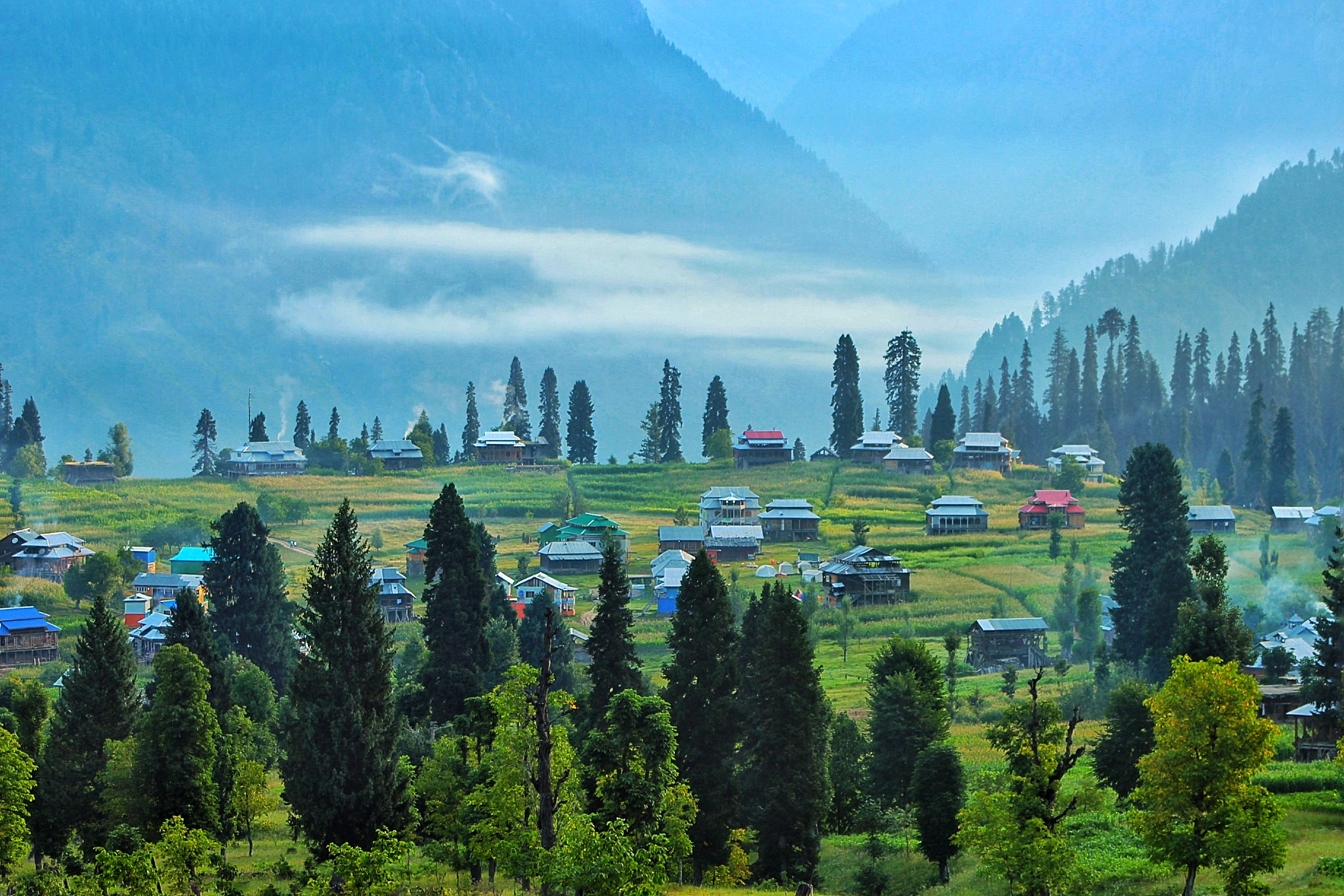
- Arang Kel is set in a verdant valley.

- Location in Azad Kashmir
- Coordinates: 34.80°N 74.33°E
- Country: Pakistan
- Elevation: 2,554 m (8,379 ft)
- Time zone: UTC+5:00 (PST)

Arang Kel (Urdu: اڑنگ کیل) is a village and tourist spot in the Neelam valley of Azad Kashmir. It is located on the hilltop above Kel at an altitude of 2,554 meters (8,379 ft).

== Gallery ==
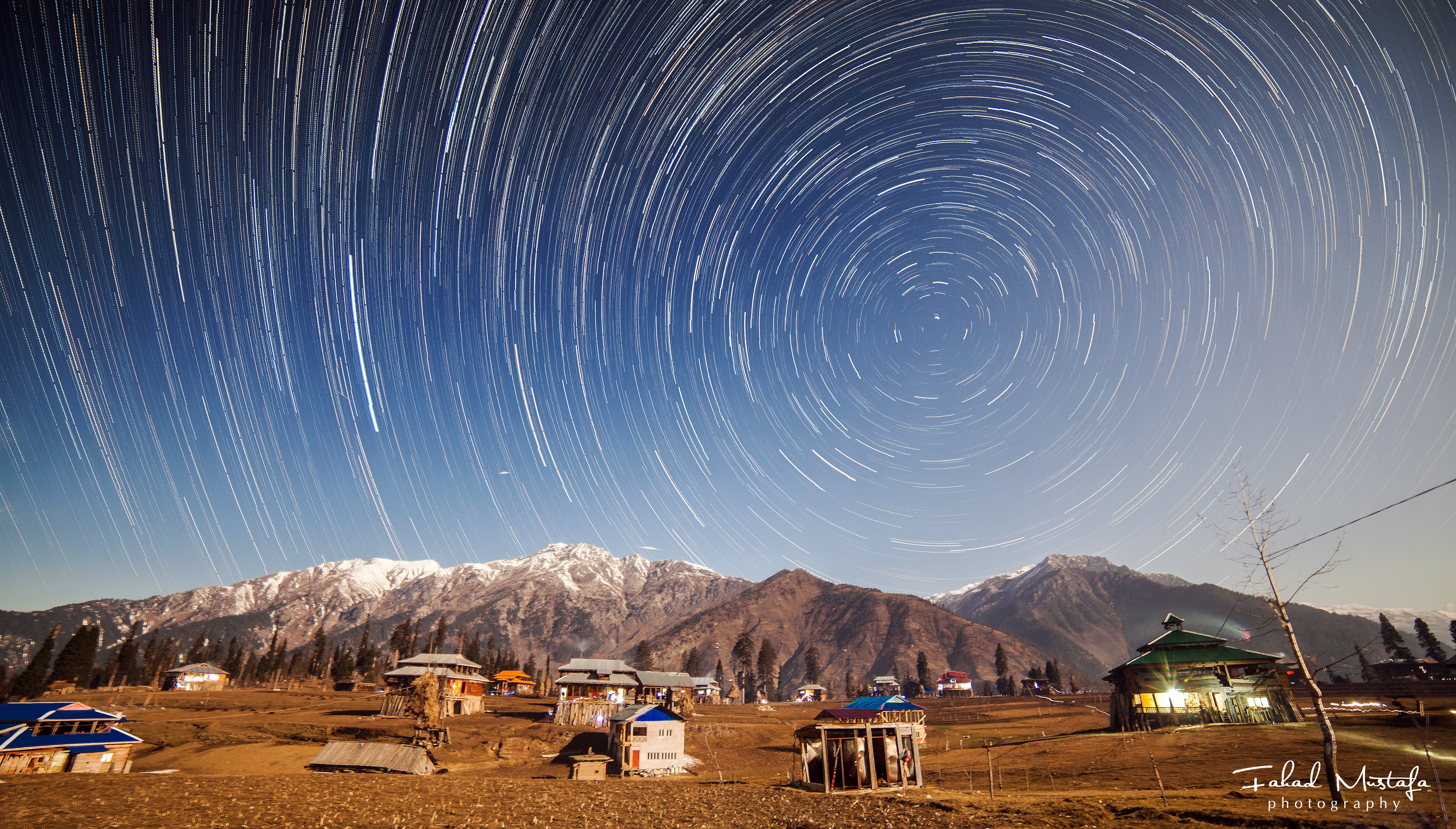

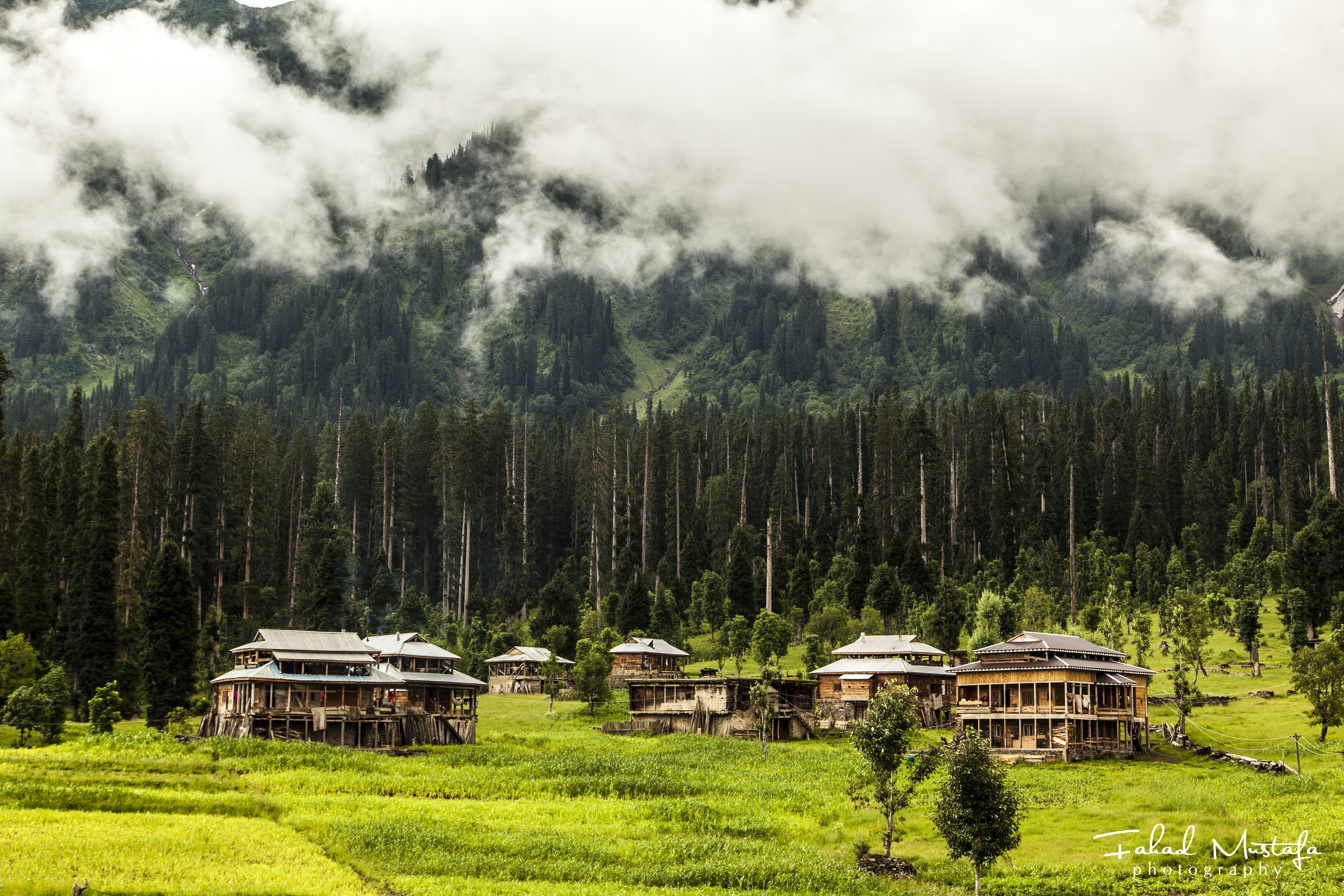
Arang Kel Neelum Valley

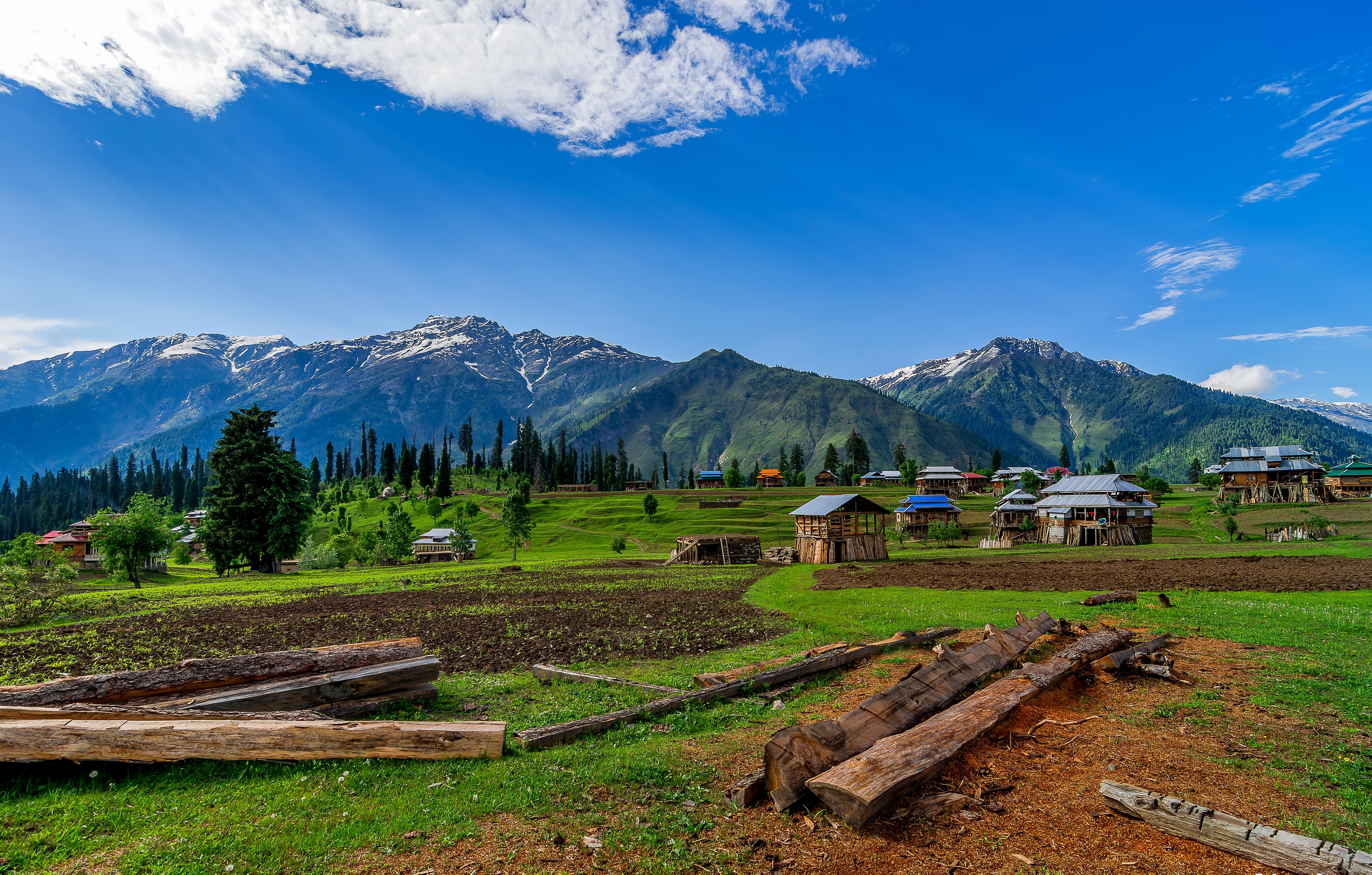

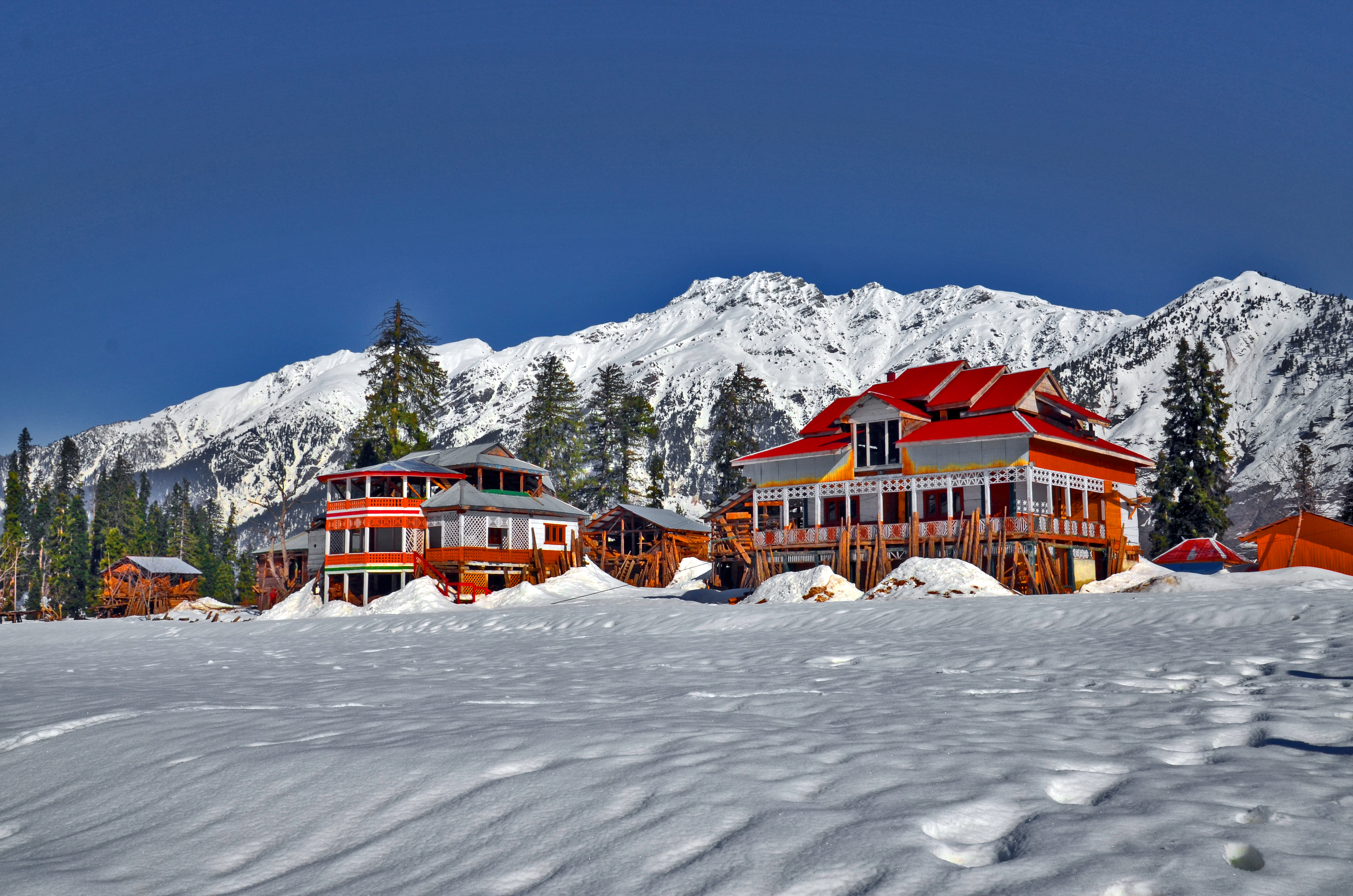
Arang Kel in winter

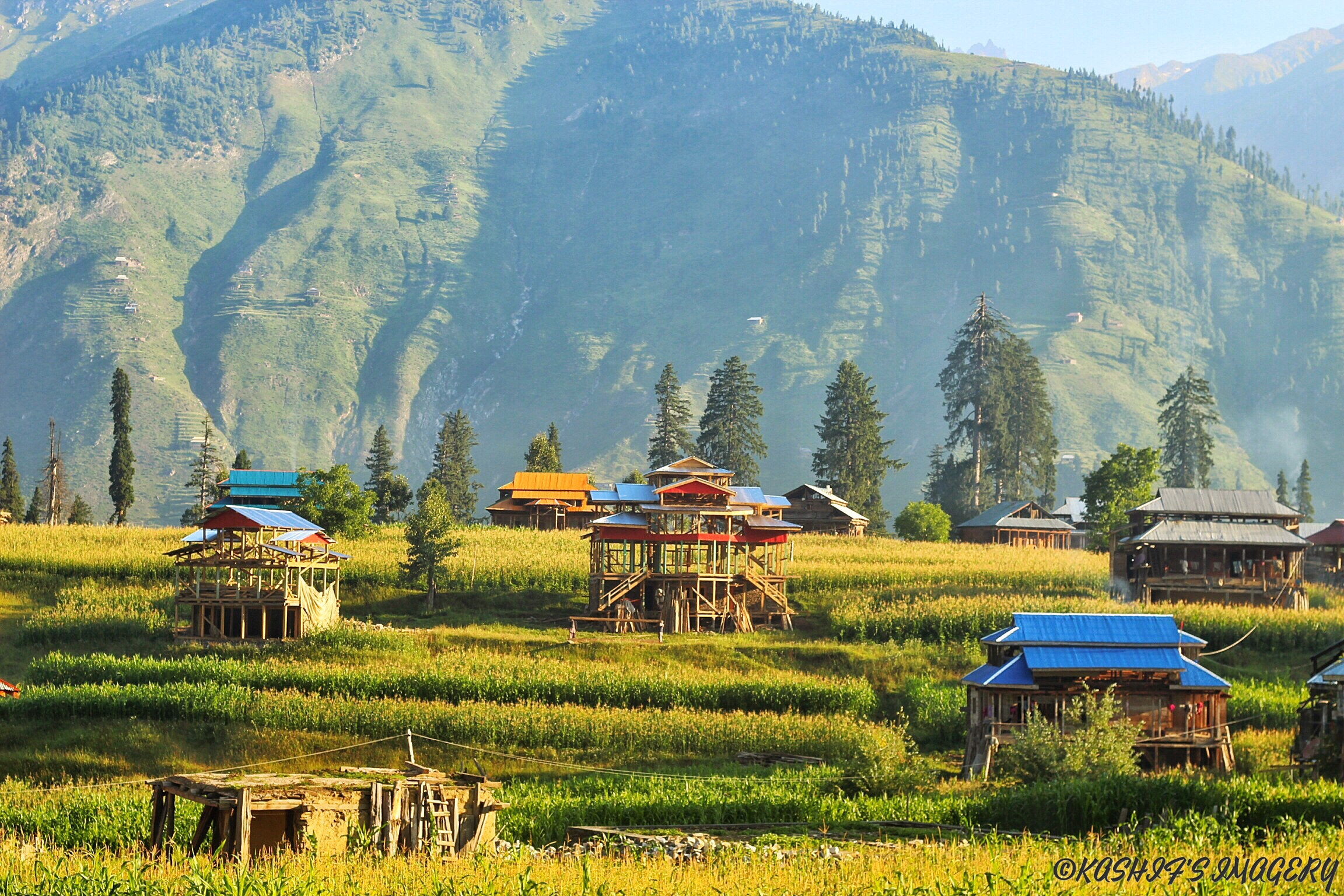

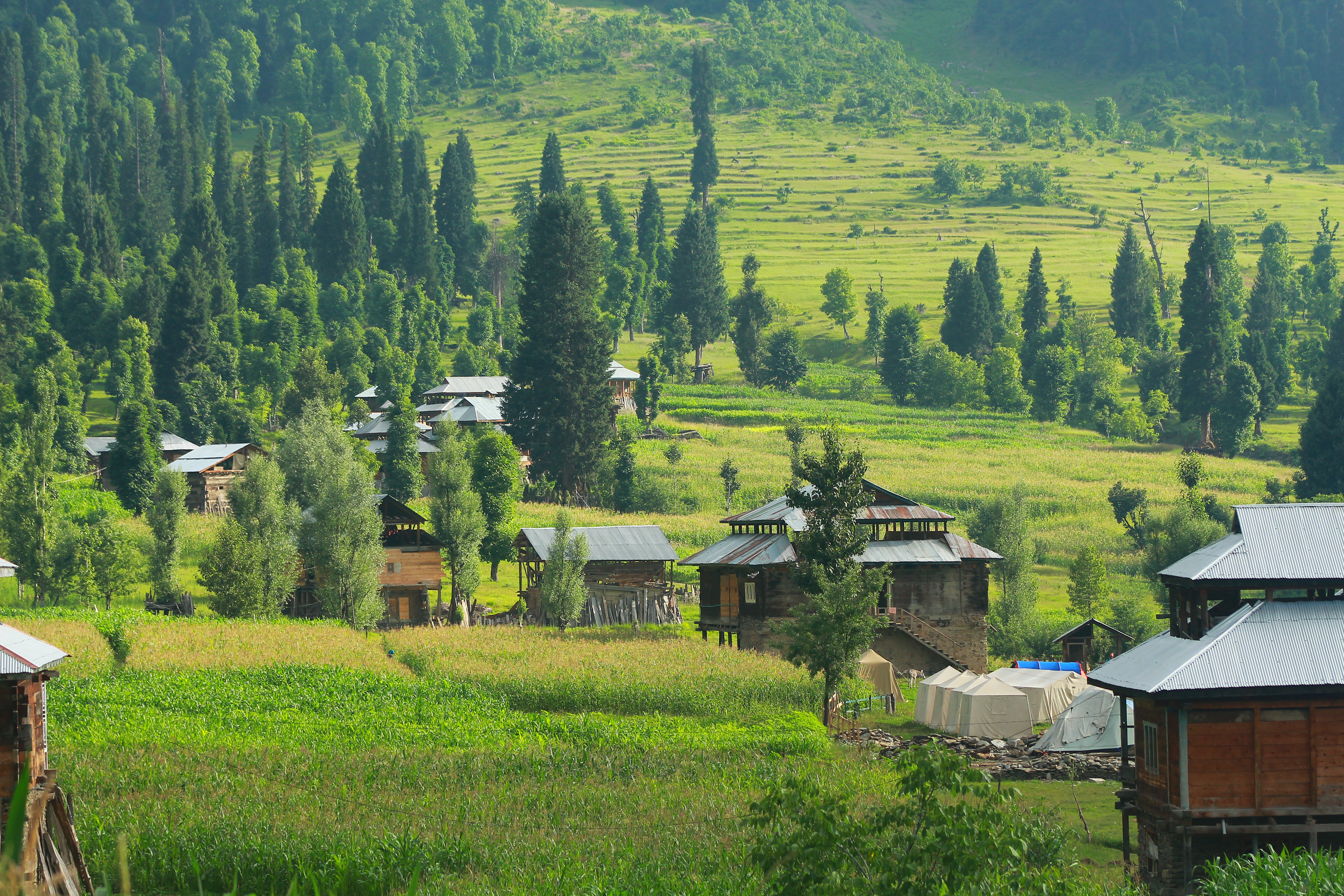

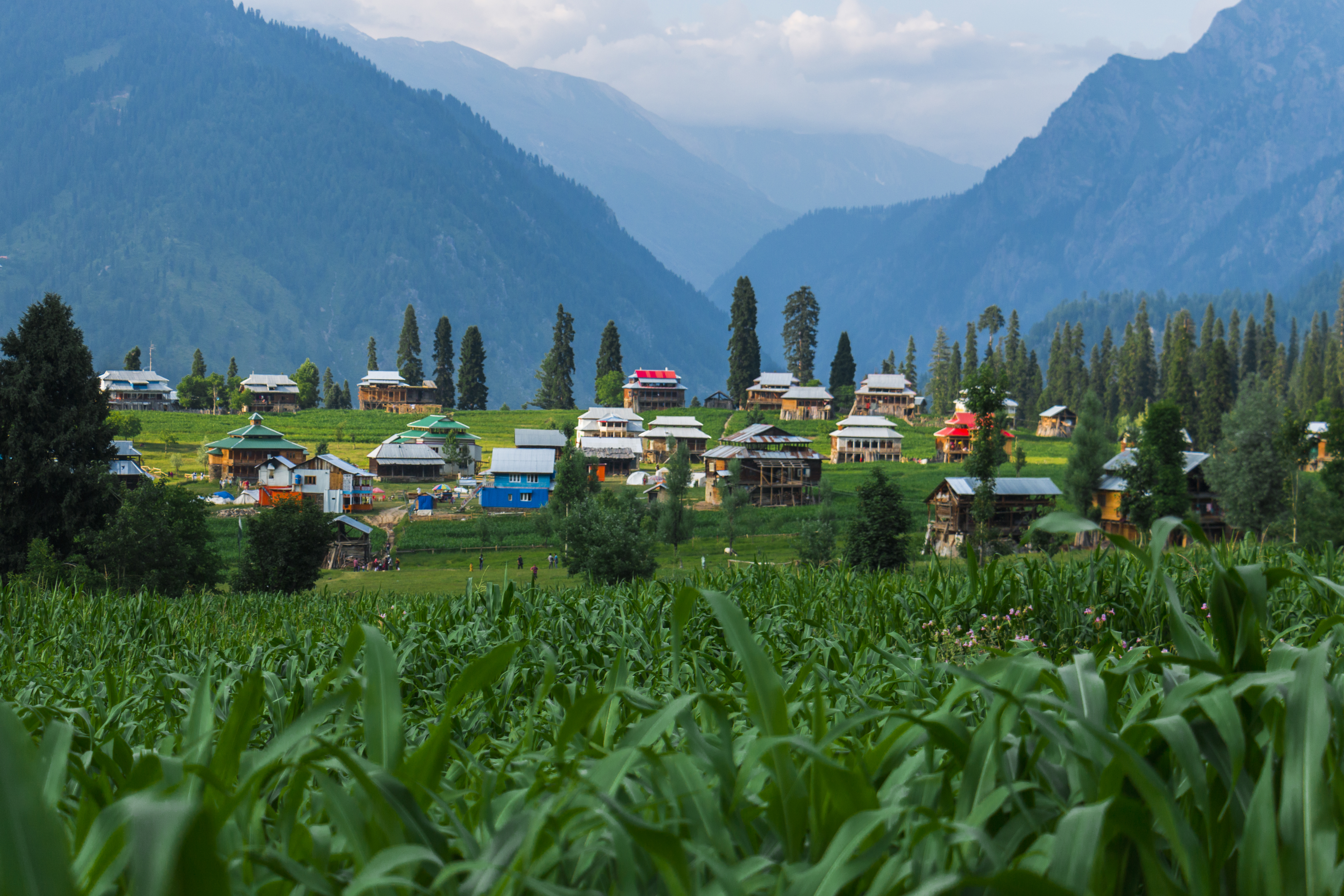

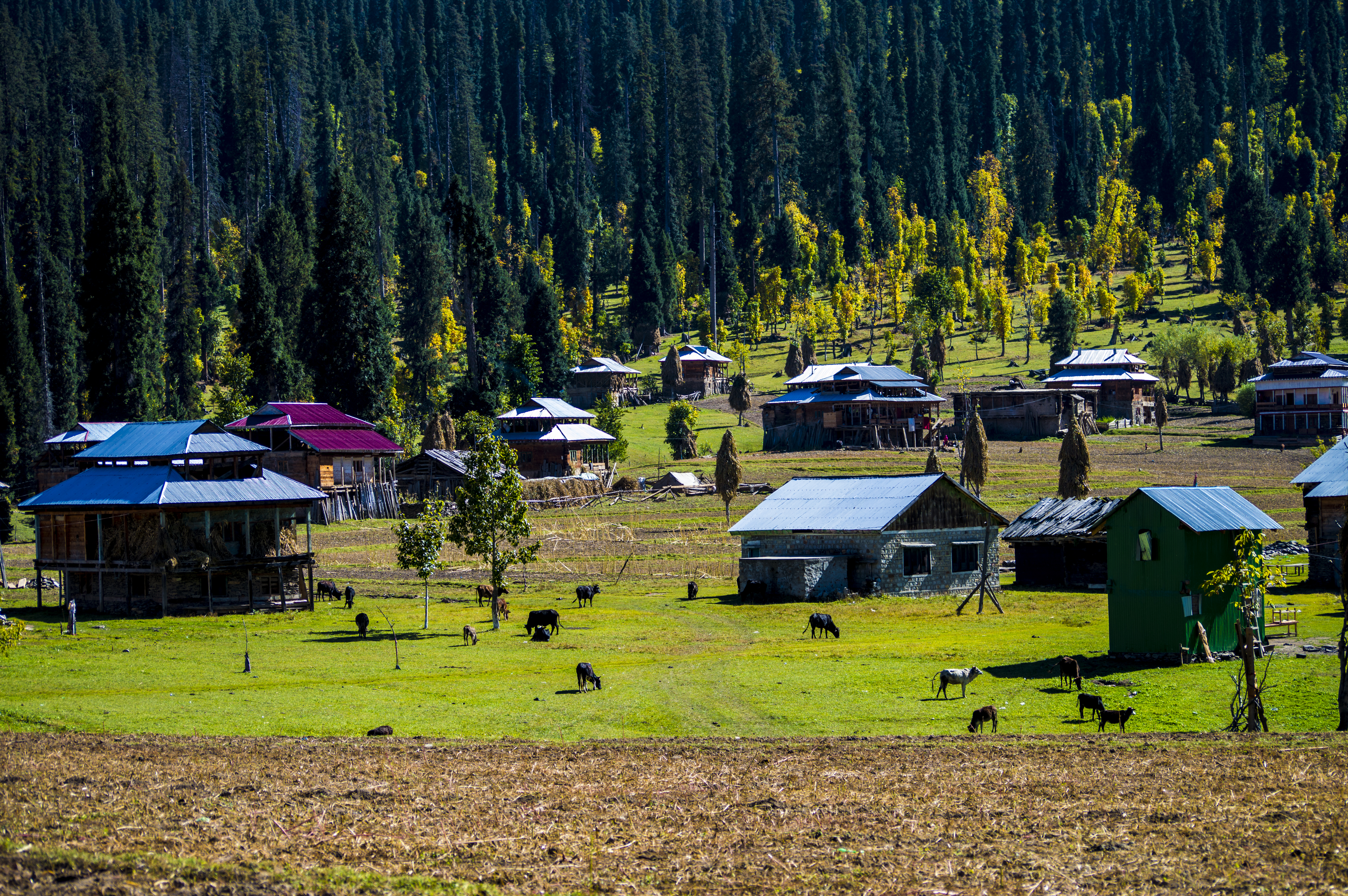

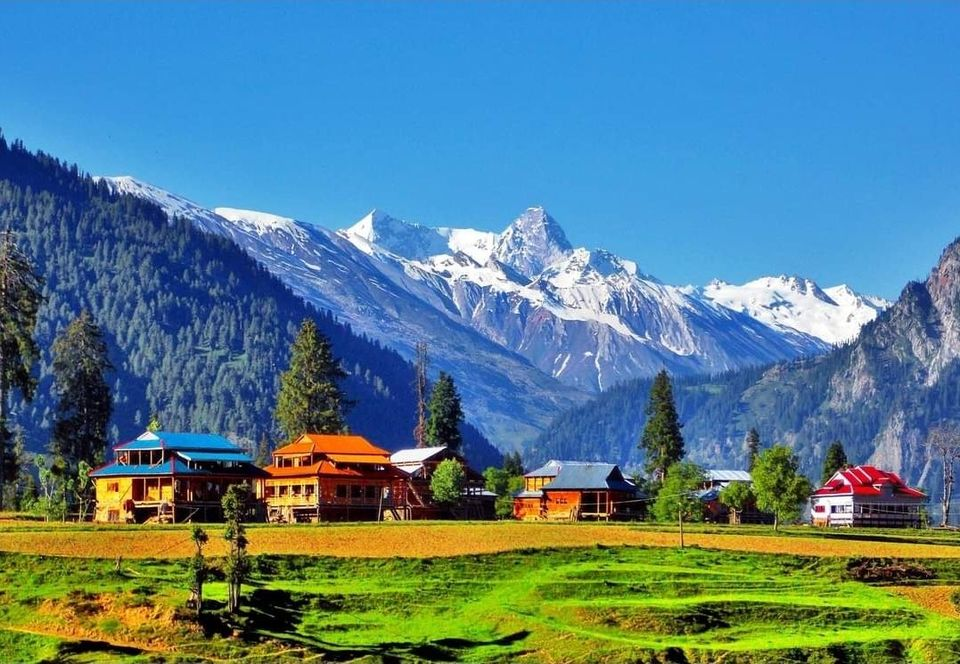

== See also ==
- Taobat
- Sharda
- Keran
- Kutton
- Athmuqam
