= List of legislatures in South Asia =

In South Asia, five countries have parliamentary governments, including Bangladesh, Bhutan, India, Nepal and Pakistan. Of these, three are federal republics (India, Nepal and Pakistan), one is a unitary republic (Bangladesh) and one is a constitutional monarchy (Bhutan). Two South Asian countries, the Maldives and Sri Lanka, have either presidential (Maldives) or semi-presidential (Sri Lanka) governments which are accountable to elected legislatures; and both are unitary states.

South Asia is the world's most populous region among constitutional democratic republics, with over 1 billion people living under democratic systems, compared to populations of 500 million people in the European Union, North America or South America. The three core countries of the Indian subcontinent, including Bangladesh, India and Pakistan, began their modern democratic experiment as part of the British Indian Empire, particularly with the legislatures of British India. Sri Lanka is the oldest democracy in Asia in terms of universal suffrage, which was granted by the Donoughmore Constitution in 1931. Today, fundamental rights are enshrined in the constitutions of all South Asian countries.

The vast expanse of subnational units in India and Pakistan share a common feature of parliamentary government. All the 28 states of India and 4 provinces of Pakistan are governed by legislatures. Despite the extensive democratic framework, there are significant deficits and challenges to democracy, including human rights abuses, militarism and authoritarianism. Moreover, there is little cooperation between parliaments in the region. The state and provincial governments of India and Pakistan hardly engage with neighboring countries like Bangladesh, Sri Lanka and Nepal. Regional and local governments in unitary countries like Bangladesh and Sri Lanka also lack relations with regional counterparts in their neighboring countries.

== Afghanistan ==
- Leadership Council

== Bangladesh ==
- Parliament of Bangladesh

== Bhutan ==
- Parliament of Bhutan
  - National Council of Bhutan
  - National Assembly of Bhutan

== India ==
=== Federal Legislature ===
- Parliament of India
  - Rajya Sabha
  - Lok Sabha

=== State Legislatures ===
- Andhra Pradesh Legislature
  - Andhra Pradesh Legislative Council
  - Andhra Pradesh Legislative Assembly
- Arunachal Pradesh Legislative Assembly
- Assam Legislative Assembly
- Bihar Legislature
  - Bihar Legislative Council
  - Bihar Legislative Assembly
- Chhattisgarh Legislative Assembly
- Goa Legislative Assembly
- Gujarat Legislative Assembly
- Haryana Legislative Assembly
- Himachal Pradesh Legislative Assembly
- Jharkhand Legislative Assembly
- Karnataka Legislature
  - Karnataka Legislative Council
  - Karnataka Legislative Assembly
- Kerala Legislative Assembly
- Madhya Pradesh Legislative Assembly
- Maharashtra Legislature
  - Maharashtra Legislative Council
  - Maharashtra Legislative Assembly
- Manipur Legislative Assembly
- Meghalaya Legislative Assembly
- Mizoram Legislative Assembly
- Nagaland Legislative Assembly
- Odisha Legislative Assembly
- Punjab Legislative Assembly
- Rajasthan Legislative Assembly
- Sikkim Legislative Assembly
- Tamil Nadu Legislative Assembly
- Telangana Legislature
  - Telangana Legislative Council
  - Telangana Legislative Assembly
- Tripura Legislative Assembly
- Uttar Pradesh Legislature
  - Uttar Pradesh Legislative Council
  - Uttar Pradesh Legislative Assembly
- Uttarakhand Legislative Assembly
- West Bengal Legislative Assembly

=== Union Territory Legislatures ===
- Delhi Legislative Assembly
- Jammu and Kashmir Legislative Assembly
- Puducherry Legislative Assembly

== Maldives ==
- People's Majlis

== Nepal ==
=== Federal Legislature ===
- Parliament of Nepal
  - Rastriya Sabha
  - Pratinidhi Sabha

=== Provincial Legislatures ===
- Provincial Assembly of Province No. 1
- Provincial Assembly of Madhesh Province
- Provincial Assembly of Bagmati Pradesh
- Provincial Assembly of Gandaki Pradesh
- Provincial Assembly of Lumbini Province
- Provincial Assembly of Karnali Pradesh
- Provincial Assembly of Sudurpashchim Pradesh

== Pakistan ==
=== Federal Legislature ===
- Parliament of Pakistan
  - Senate of Pakistan
  - National Assembly of Pakistan

=== Provincial Legislatures ===
- Provincial Assembly of Balochistan
- Khyber Pakhtunkhwa Assembly
- Provincial Assembly of Punjab
- Provincial Assembly of Sindh

=== Extra-constitutionally administered Territory Legislatures ===
- Azad Kashmir Legislative Assembly
- Gilgit-Baltistan Legislative Assembly

== Sri Lanka ==
- Parliament of Sri Lanka

== See also ==
- List of legislatures
