= Gugdar =

Village in Kashmir region

Coordinates: 33°52′34″N 74°01′55″E

Gugdar is a remote village located in the Haveli District of Azad Jammu and Kashmir, Pakistan. The village is situated near the Line of Control (LOC), the de facto border between Pakistan-administered and Indian-administered Kashmir. The village was formerly designated part of the Bagh District. In the 2017 census, the Bagh District had a population of 371,919, with Gugdar being one of its smaller settlements.

== Location and access ==
Gugdar is accessible via two primary routes: one from Bagh and another from Abbaspur. Both routes converge at Mahmood Gali, a mountain pass that serves as a key junction in the region. The roads are narrow and can become impassable during winter months due to heavy snowfall, particularly in December and January. Efforts have been made in recent years to improve snow removal and road maintenance, reducing the duration of isolation for residents during severe weather.

The village is approximately a 2–3 hour drive from Bagh town under normal conditions. Nearby villages include Nakka, Badhal, Pallangi, Khalsa, Jabbar, Taran, and Chaya.

== Infrastructure and services ==
Gugdar hosts a middle school for boys, a high school for girls, a rural health center, and a local bazaar. Healthcare services are limited; the basic health unit is primarily staffed by a dispenser, with a doctor available intermittently. For more comprehensive medical treatment, residents often travel to Forward Kahuta, approximately a 45-minute drive away.

The 2005 Kashmir earthquake had a significant impact on the region, damaging infrastructure and disrupting educational services. Many private schools were closed or faced shortages of qualified teaching staff in the aftermath. In response, various non-governmental organizations (NGOs) initiated reconstruction efforts. For instance, the Japanese NGO JEN constructed two primary schools in the nearby areas of Looyian Kalsan and Jahani Wala in 2006. Australian Aid supported the local health center staff with supplies and training.

== Demographics ==
People living in this area belong to a tribe called Khawaja. Other tribes include Rathore, Sheikh and Gujjar.

== History ==
In the late 1980s, a fire—believed to have started from a kerosene oil container—destroyed the Gugdar Bazaar, which was predominantly constructed of timber. The incident resulted in significant economic loss for local shopkeepers.

During heightened tensions between India and Pakistan in 2003, Gugdar was reportedly affected by cross-border shelling due to its proximity to the LOC. Such incidents have had lasting impacts on the village's security and development.

== Climate ==
Gugdar experiences a mild climate during the summer months, offering pleasant conditions for residents. Winters are harsh, with temperatures dropping significantly and snowfall occurring between December and February. Most homes lack central heating, making the cold months particularly challenging for inhabitants.
