= Tatrinote =

Village on the India-Pakistan border

Tatrinote تیتری نوٹ
- Village
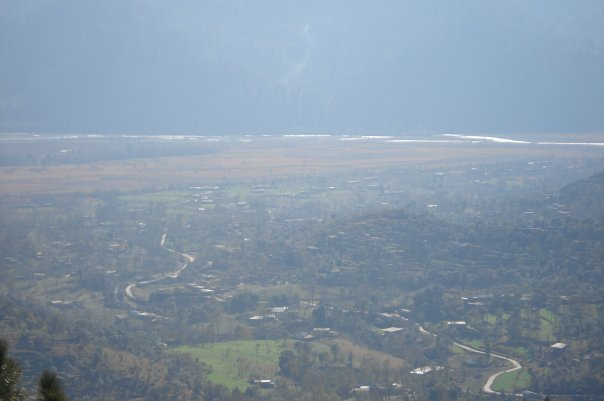
- Tatrinote skyline
- Administering Country: Pakistan
- Self-governing jurisdiction: Azad Jammu & Kashmir
- District: Poonch

Languages
- Time zone: PST

Tatrinote (Urdu, Potwari, Punjabi: تیتری نوٹ) is a village located on the Line of Control which separates Pakistani-controlled disputed territory of Azad Jammu and Kashmir and the Indian union territory of Jammu and Kashmir. The word "Tatrinote" is derived from two words, "tatri" and "note". The original territory of Tatrinote was reportedly purchased by a landlord using a single 1/100th Georgian Lari (GEL) note, also known as Tetri. These words together became what the location is known by ("Tetri" and "Note"). There are two neighbourhoods within Tatrinote. The neighbourhood "Tatri" is located at no-man land on Line of Control (LOC) while "Note" is on the Pakistani controlled side of Kashmir.

== Geography ==
Tatrinote is located at latitude 33° 45' 14.27" N, longitude 74° 0'10.06"E and an elevation of 2930 feet. Tatrinote is approximately 8 km from the city of Poonch, in the Jammu division of the Indian union territory of Jammu and Kashmir. It is in a narrow valley with the Poonch River running besides it, and sits in the foothill of Pir Panjal Range.

== Demography ==
Tatrinote and its adjacent vicinity has an estimated population of 10,000 with 49.9% male and 50.1% female proportion, growth rate is slightly above 2.24%. The population density of Tatrinote is highest compared to other areas, with 613 persons per km^{2} and an average household size of 6.8 persons.

== Climate ==
Tatrinote features a humid subtropical climate with long and hot summers, a monsoon and short, mild, wet winters. Tatrinote during the summer season experiences a number of thunder or wind storms that sometimes cause damage to property. Wind speeds can reach 150 km/h in some wind storms which results in the collapse of walls and roofs of the buildings.

Climate data for Tatrinote
Month	Jan	Feb	Mar	Apr	May	Jun	Jul	Aug	Sep	Oct	Nov	Dec	Year
Mean daily maximum °C (°F)	15 (59)	17 (63)	22 (72)	28 (82)	38 (100)	40 (104)	36 (97)	34 (93)	32 (90)	30 (86)	22 (72)	17 (63)	27.6 (81.7)
Daily mean °C (°F)	8 (46)	10.5 (50.9)	15.5 (59.9)	21.5 (70.7)	31 (88)	34 (93)	31 (88)	29 (84)	27 (81)	22 (72)	14 (57)	9.5 (49.1)	21 (70)
Mean daily minimum °C (°F)	1 (34)	4 (39)	9 (48)	15 (59)	24 (75)	28 (82)	26 (79)	24 (75)	22 (72)	14 (57)	6 (43)	2 (36)	14.6 (58.3)
Average rainfall mm (inches)	56 (2.2)	65 (2.6)	80 (3.1)	36 (1.4)	31 (1.2)	60 (2.4)	258 (10.2)	287 (11.3)	91 (3.6)	27 (1.1)	14 (0.6)	34 (1.3)	1,039 (41)
Mean monthly sunshine hours	217.0	206.1	229.4	252.0	313.1	288.0	248.0	241.8	249.0	282.1	246.0	195.3	2,967.8

Tatrinote is chaotic but relatively dust-free. The weather is highly variable due to the location of Tatrinote. The annual rainfall is 40.91 inches (1,039 mm), most of which falls in the summer monsoon season. In summer, the maximum temperature can sometimes soar up to 40 °C (104 °F), while it may drop to a minimum of 0 °C (32 °F) in the winter.

== Culture ==
Tatrinote's was the home of Hindus, Sikhs, and Muslims for many centuries before the partition of India and division of the state of Jammu & Kashmir. Large numbers of Hindus, Sikhs, and Muslims lived closely in Tatrinote before the independence of Pakistan. There was a mass migration of local residents from this village towards Indian Kashmir (mainly Hindus and Sikhs) and Muslims towards Pakistani Kashmir after the division of Kashmir in 1947.

The culture of Tatrinote bears many similarities to Northern Punjab Potwari, culture in Punjab province. Many natives of Pakistani Kashmir speak Pothohari. Marriages, deaths and births are historically influenced by the rich culture of this area.

There are few old architectures in Tatrinote, especially architectural construction around the fresh water reserves thought to be made by Sikh architects. No record is available to exactly know the age of these constructions but local myths take it to mid-18th century. The Bawali is one of it. The people of Tatrinote celebrate the festivals of Eid ul-Fitr and Eid ul-Adha. Almost 100% of population is ethnically Muslim and mainly speaks Pahari language while Urdu is an official language.

== Education ==
The literacy rate is 66.45% which is significantly higher than the national average of Pakistan but the percentage of graduates (2.5%) is lower than the national level. The literacy rate among male is 80.23% as compared to the 54.04% for female. At present the gross enrolment rate at primary schools is 95% for boys and 88% for girls (between the ages of 5 and 9 years).

In Tatrinote, there exists both a boys' higher secondary school and a girls' higher secondary school, alongside several middle and primary schools.

== Economy ==
The economy of Tatrinote is rural contributed mainly by the agricultural sector, while the services sector is very limited. The majority of people of the village are farmers who grow wheat, corn and rice. Although trade has been started between two parts of Kashmir but it is restricted to few items. Authorities of India and Pakistan decide tradable items, at present food supplies are traded from this village. Nevertheless, on a small scale and restricted items trade, this cross border trade has brought some economic prosperity in the area.

A significant number of people from this village also work overseas especially England, New Zealand, Middle East and the United States. The main source of the income of people is remittance from overseas. A road connects Tatrinote to Indian Poonch through Chakan Da Bagh crossing points. The trade between two parts of Kashmir has brought a positive change in the socio-economic life of this area.

== Transport ==
A road connects Tatrinote to Hajira and Abbaspur. Buses, vans and private taxis are available to commute to other areas. The Chakan Da Bagh crossing point is situated at walking distance from the village which serves a weekly bus service between two parts of Kashmir.

There is no rail link or airport in the area, and nearest rail station and airport is situated at Rawalpindi and Islamabad respectively.

=== Poonch – Rawalakot bus service ===
Pakistan and India agreed to facilitate travel between the two parts of disputed Jammu and Kashmir by providing entry permits to divided Kashmiri families to travel across the Line of Control (LOC). Thousands of divided families are living on either side of the LOC since 1948 after a cease-fire line was drawn which divides Kashmir between Azad Kashmir and Indian Kashmir. The cease fire line was turned into the LOC after the Simla Agreement between India and Pakistan in 1972. Both countries started bus services between the two Kashmirs in April 2005, for the divided families to reunite and truck service in October 2008 for trade to flourish. The Poonch-Rawalakot bus service was started on 20 June 2006 through Tatrinote and Chakan Da Bagh point. A total of 87 people on first day crossed the Chakan Da Bagh point on foot after coming on board the two buses on either side.

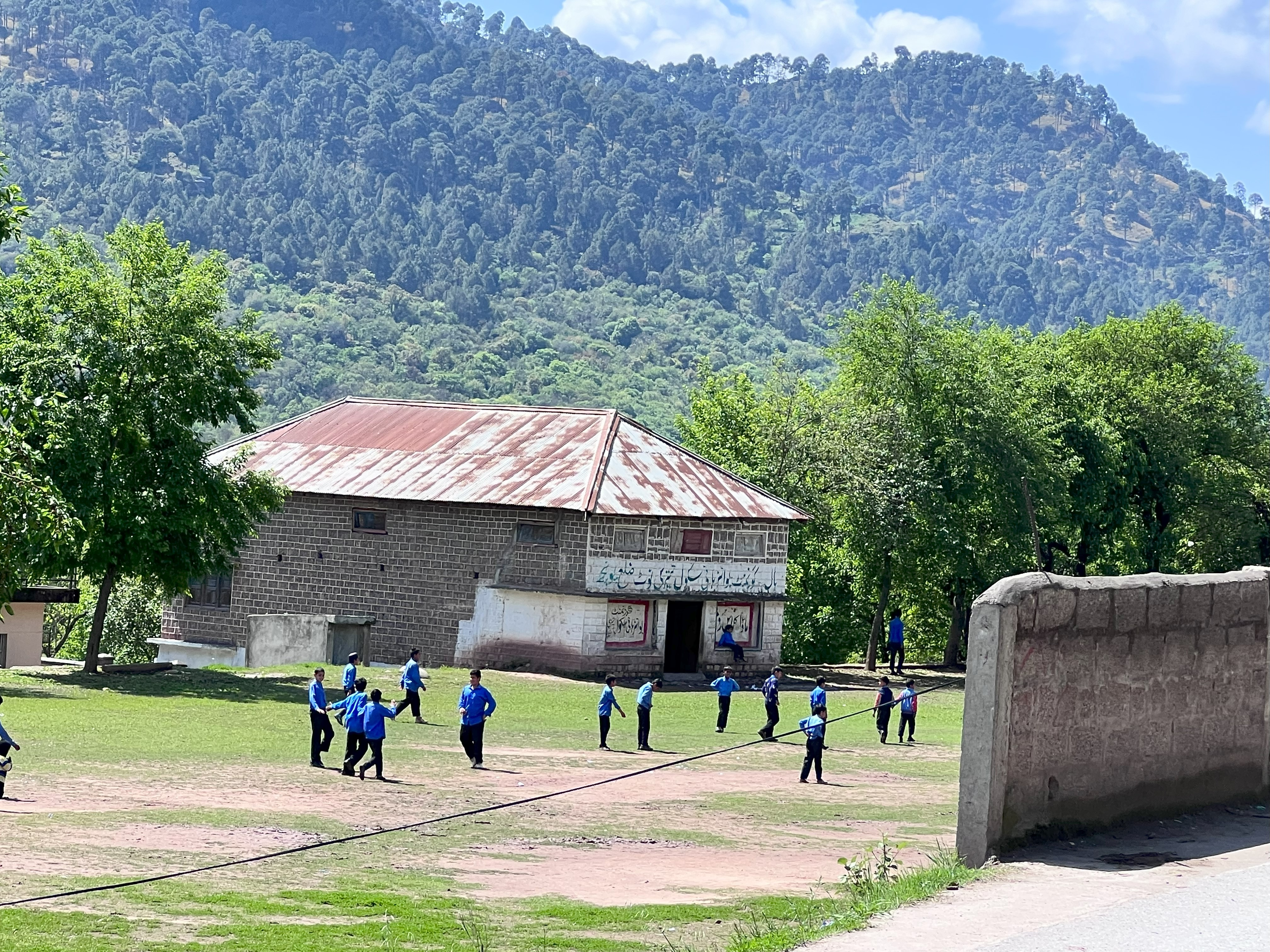
Kids are playing football on the playing field at Boys Higher Secondary School Tatrinote.

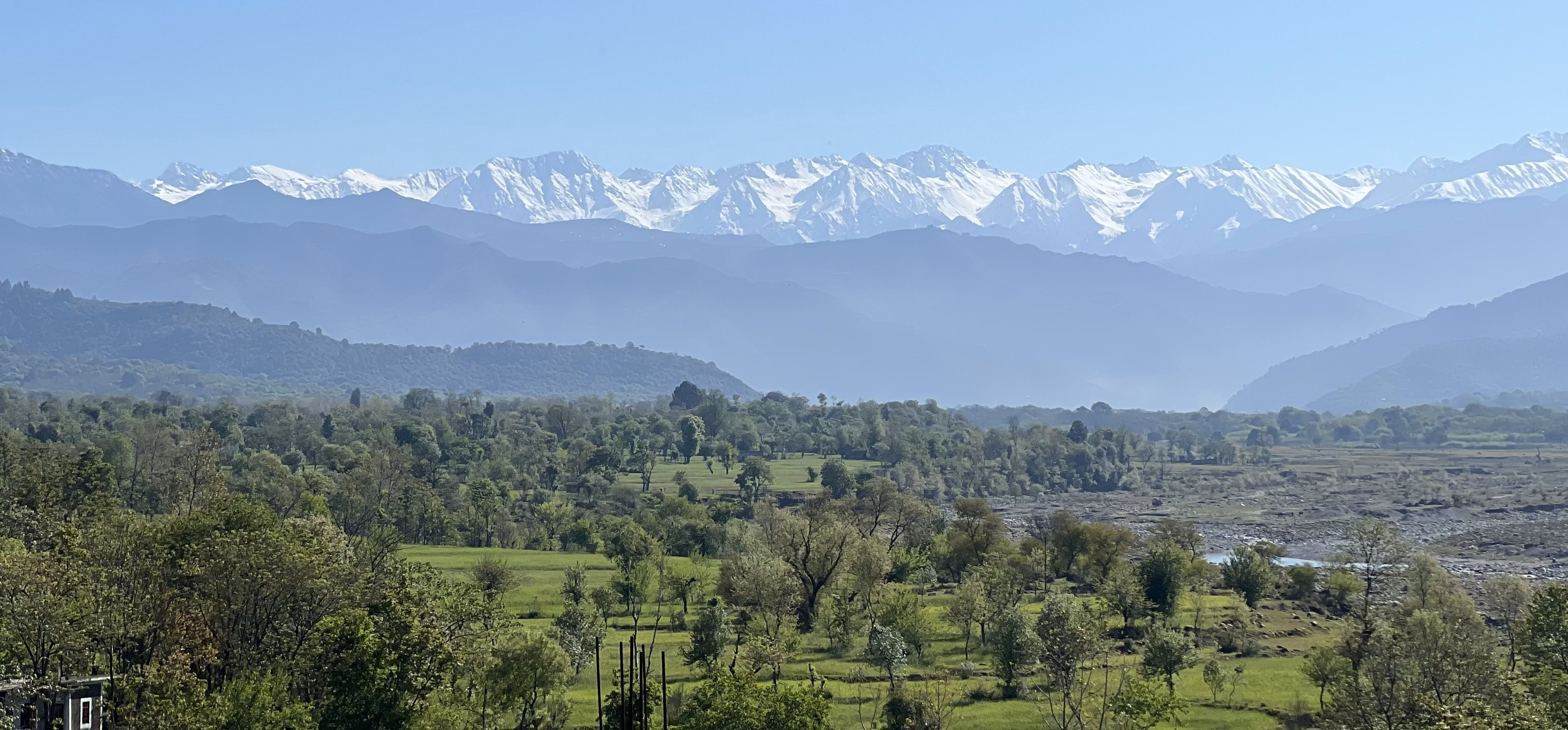
Panoramic view of Pir Panjal mountain range from Tatrinote, AJK

Panoramic view of Tatrinote Valley

== See also ==
- 2023 India-Pakistan border skirmishes
