= Clusivity =

Grammatical distinction in pronouns and agreement

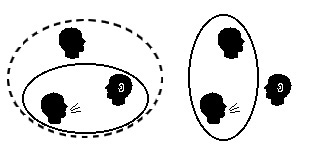
Sets of reference: Inclusive form (left) and exclusive form (right)

In linguistics, clusivity is a grammatical distinction between inclusive and exclusive first-person pronouns and verbal morphology, also called inclusive "we" and exclusive "we". Inclusive "we" specifically includes the addressee, while exclusive "we" specifically excludes the addressee; in other words, two (or more) words that both translate to "we", one meaning "you and I, and possibly someone else", the other meaning "I and some other person or persons, but not you". While imagining that this sort of distinction could be made in other persons (particularly the second) is straightforward, in fact the existence of second-person clusivity (you vs you and they) in natural languages is controversial and not well attested. While clusivity is not a feature of the English language, it is found in many languages around the world.

The first published description of the inclusive-exclusive distinction by a European linguist was in a description of languages of Peru in 1560 by Domingo de Santo Tomás in his Grammatica o arte de la lengua general de los indios de los Reynos del Perú, published in Valladolid, Spain.

== Schematic paradigm ==
Clusivity paradigms may be summarized as a two-by-two grid:

		Includes the addressee?	
		Yes	No
Includes the speaker?	Yes	Inclusive we: I and you (and possibly they)	Exclusive we: I and they, but not you
Includes the speaker?	No	you / yous(e) / y'all	they

== Morphology ==
In some languages, the three first-person pronouns appear to be unrelated roots. That is the case for Chechen, which has singular со (so), exclusive тхо (txo), and inclusive вай (vay). In others, however, all three are transparently simple compounds, as in Tok Pisin, an English creole spoken in Papua New Guinea, which has singular mi, exclusive mi-pela, and inclusive yu-mi (a compound of mi with yu "you") or yu-mi-pela. However, when only one of the plural pronouns is related to the singular, that may be the case for either one. In some dialects of Mandarin Chinese, for example, inclusive or exclusive 我們／我们 wǒmen is the plural form of singular 我 wǒ "I", and inclusive 咱們／咱们 zánmen is a separate root. However, in Hadza, the inclusive, ’one-be’e, is the plural of the singular ’ono (’one-) "I", and the exclusive, ’oo-be’e, is a separate root.

It is not uncommon for two separate words for "I" to pluralize into derived words, which have a clusivity distinction. For example, in Vietnamese, the familiar word for "I" (ta) pluralizes to inclusive we (chúng ta), and the formal or cold (Note: i.e., sober, rigid) word for "I" (tôi) pluralizes into exclusive we (chúng tôi). In Samoan, the singular form of the exclusive is the regular word for "I", and the singular form of the inclusive may also occur on its own and then also means "I" but with a connotation of appealing or asking for indulgence.

In the Kunama language of Eritrea, the first-person inclusive and exclusive distinction is marked on dual and plural forms of verbs, independent pronouns, and possessive pronouns.

== Distinction in verbs ==
Where verbs are inflected for person, as in the native languages of Australia and in many Native American languages, the inclusive-exclusive distinction can be made there as well. For example, in Maliseet-Passamaquoddy, "I/We have it" (present indefinite tense) is expressed as:

Singular n-tíhin (first person prefix n-)
Exclusive n-tíhin-èn (first person n- + plural suffix -èn)
Inclusive k-tíhin-èn (inclusive prefix k- + plural -èn)

This is strikingly similar to Odia, where for a single "we" pronoun, there are two different verb conjugations, depending upon the clusivity. For example, "I/We will eat" (future indefinite tense) is expressed as:

Singular ମୁଁ ଖାଇବି mũ khāibi (first person ମୁଁ mũ + singular suffix ି/-ଇ -i)
Exclusive ଆମେ ଖାଇବୁ āmē khāibu (first person ଆମେ āmē + exclusive first person plural suffix ୁ/-ଉ -u)
Inclusive ଆମେ ଖାଇବା āmē khāibā (first person ଆମେ āmē + inclusive first person plural suffix ା/-ଆ -ā)

In Tamil, on the other hand, the two different pronouns have the same agreement in the verb (quite opposite to the above examples).

== First-person clusivity ==
First-person clusivity is a common feature among Dravidian, Kartvelian, and Caucasian languages, Australian and Austronesian languages, and is also found in languages of northeastern, eastern, southern, and southeastern Asia, Americas, and in some creole languages. Some Sub-Saharan African languages also make the distinction, such as the Fula language, as well as some Indo-Aryan languages, such as Odia, Gujarati, Marathi, Sindhi, Rajasthani, Haryanvi, (Note: The clusivity is present in nearly all of Haryana, except that of Ambala, Panchkula, Yamunanagar, Karnal, Panipat, Faridabad, Palwal, etc.) plus even in certain dialects (though not in the standarised (ṭaksālī) registers) of Saraiki, (Note: The clusivity is only present in certain dialects spoken in the upper Sindh (such as that are in proximity to Sindhi). It is not present in the standardised (ṭaksālī) register of dialects spoken near Multan, which are also influenced by the standarised Majhi register of Punjabi.) Punjabi (Note: The clusivity is present only in certain Charhda dialects (such as Malwai, Puadhi). It is not present in the standardised (ṭaksālī) Majhi register, as well as in the Lahnda, Pahari-Pothwari, and other Charhda dialects (such as Doabi and Pahari). Meanwhile, both the Raiboli and Saraiki dialects are a mixed bag.) and Hindustani (Hindi-Urdu). (Note: The clusivity is present only in the southern/peninsular India (including Bombay Hindi, Hyderabadi Urdu and Dakhini). It is not present in either of the standardised registers of Hindi and Urdu.) No European language outside the Caucasus makes this distinction grammatically, but some constructions may be semantically inclusive or exclusive.

=== Singular inclusive forms ===
Several Polynesian languages, such as Samoan and Tongan, have clusivity with overt dual and plural suffixes in their pronouns. The lack of a suffix indicates the singular. The exclusive form is used in the singular as the normal word for "I", but the inclusive also occurs in the singular. The distinction is one of discourse: the singular inclusive has been described as the "modesty I" in Tongan. It is often rendered in English as one, but in Samoan, its use has been described as indicating emotional involvement on the part of the speaker.

== Second-person clusivity ==
In theory, clusivity of the second person should be a possible distinction, but its existence is controversial. Clusivity in the second person is conceptually simple, but nonetheless, if it exists is extremely rare, unlike clusivity in the first. Hypothetical second-person clusivity would be the distinction between "you and you (and you and you... all present)" and "you (one or more addressees) and someone else whom I am not addressing currently." These are often referred to in the literature as "2+2" and "2+3", respectively (the numbers referring to second and third person as appropriate).

Some notable linguists, such as Bernard Comrie, have attested that the distinction is extant in spoken natural languages, while others, such as John Henderson, maintain that a clusivity distinction in the second person is too complex to process. Many other linguists take the more neutral position that it could exist but is nonetheless not currently attested. Horst J. Simon provides a deep analysis of second-person clusivity in his 2005 article. He concludes that oft-repeated rumors regarding the existence of second-person clusivity—or indeed, any [+3] pronoun feature beyond simple exclusive we – are ill-founded, and based on erroneous analysis of the data.

This could also be used for first person, which would further complicate the concept of clusivity by introducing the same concept to “we”, such as “me and you and someone who’s next to us” and “me and you and someone who’s not here” and “me and someone next to me but not you” and “me and someone who’s not here but not you” and perhaps even a dual form that just means “me you and no one else”.

== Distribution of the clusivity distinction ==
The inclusive–exclusive distinction occurs nearly universally among the Austronesian languages and the languages of northern Australia, but rarely in the nearby Papuan languages (Tok Pisin, an English-Melanesian creole, generally has the inclusive–exclusive distinction, but this varies with the speaker's language background.). It is widespread in India, featuring in the Dravidian, Kiranti, and Munda languages, as well as in several Indo-European languages of India such as Odia, Marathi, Rajasthani, Haryanvi, Punjabi, Saraiki, Hindustani (Hindi-Urdu), Sindhi and Gujarati (which either borrowed it from Dravidian or retained it as a substratum while Dravidian was displaced; or in the case of Odia, most likely retaining it as a Munda substratum). It can also be found in the languages of eastern Siberia, such as Tungusic, as well as northern Mandarin Chinese. In indigenous languages of the Americas, it is found in about half the languages, with no clear geographic or genealogical pattern. It is also found in a few languages of the Caucasus and Sub-Saharan Africa, such as Fulani, and Khoekhoe.

It is, of course, possible in any language to express the idea of clusivity semantically, and many languages provide common forms that clarify the ambiguity of their first person pronoun (English "the rest of us", Italian noialtri). A language with a true clusivity distinction, however, does not provide a first-person plural with indefinite clusivity in which the clusivity of the pronoun is ambiguous; rather, speakers are forced to specify by the choice of pronoun or inflexion whether they are including the addressee or not. That rules out most European languages, for example. Clusivity is nonetheless a very common language feature overall. Some languages with more than one plural number make the clusivity distinction only in, for example, the dual but not in the greater plural, but other languages make it in all numbers. In the table below, the plural forms are the ones preferentially listed.

Examples of the clusivity distinction in specific languages
Language	Inclusive form	Exclusive form	Singular related to	Notes	Language family
Ainu	a-/an-	ci-	[?]		Ainu
American Sign Language (ASL)	"K" tips up palm in (dual) "1" tap chest + twist (pl)	"K" tips up palm side (dual) "1" tap each side of chest (pl)	Exclusive plural		French Sign Language
Anishinaabemowin	giinwi	niinwi	Both	The inclusive form is derived from the second-person singular, and the exclusive form is derived from the first-person singular.	Algonquian
Apma	kidi	gema	Neither	Subject prefixes are ta- (inclusive) and kaa(ma)- (exclusive). There are also dual forms, which are derived from the plurals.	Austronesian
Aymara	jiwasa	naya	Exclusive	The derived form jiwasanaka of the inclusive refers to at least three people.	Aymaran
Bikol	kita	kami	Neither		Austronesian
Bislama	yumi	mifala	Both	The inclusive form is derived from the second-person pronoun and the first-person pronoun. There are also dual and trial forms.	English creole
Cebuano	kita	kami	Neither	Short forms are ta (incl.) and mi (excl.)	Austronesian
Chechen	vai	txo	Neither		Caucasian
Cherokee	ᎢᏂ (ini- (dual)), ᎢᏗ (idi- (plural))	ᎣᏍᏗ (osdi- (dual)), ᎣᏥ (oji- (plural))	Neither	The forms given here are the active verb agreement prefixes. Free pronouns do not distinguish clusivity.	Iroquoian
Cree, Plains	ᑭᔮᓇᐤ (kiyānaw)	ᓂᔭᓈᐣ (niyanān)	Both	The inclusive form is derived from the second-person singular pronoun, and the exclusive form is derived from the first-person singular.	Algonquian
Cree, Moose	ᑮᓛᓈᐤ (kîlânâw)	ᓃᓛᐣ (nîlân)	Both	The inclusive form is derived from the second-person singular pronoun, and the exclusive form is derived from the first-person singular.	Algonquian
Cree, Swampy	ᑮᓈᓇᐤ (kīnānaw)	ᓃᓇᓈᐣ (nīnanān)	Both	The inclusive form is derived from the second-person singular, whereas the exclusive form is derived from the first-person singular.	Algonquian
Cree, Woods	ᑮᖭᓇᐤ (kīthānaw)	ᓂᖬᓈᐣ (nīthanān)	Both	The inclusive form is derived from the second-person singular, and the exclusive form is derived from the first-person singular.	Algonquian
Daur	baa	biede	[?]		Mongolic
Evenki	mit	bū	[?]		Tungusic
Fijian	kedatou†	keitou ("we" but excludes the person spoken to)		"kedaru" also means "we" but is limited to the speaker and the person spoken to and can be translated as "you and me". † ("we" but includes both the person spoken to and the speaker as part of a finite group. To refer to a much larger group, like humanity or a race of people, "keda" is used instead.	Austronesian
Fula	𞤫𞤲 (en) 𞤫𞤯𞤫𞤲 (eɗen)	𞤥𞤭𞤲 (min) 𞤥𞤭𞤯𞤫𞤲 (miɗen)	Exclusive [?]	Examples show short- and long-form subject pronouns.	Niger-Congo
Guarani	ñande	ore	Neither		Tupi-Guarani
Gujarati	આપણે (āpaṇō)	અમે (amē)	Exclusive		Indo-European
Hadza	onebee	ôbee	Inclusive		Hadza (isolate)
Hawaiian	kāua (dual) kākou (plural)	māua (dual) mākou (plural)	Neither		Austronesian
Haryanvi	आपाँ/आपां (āpā̃) (Note: Similar to Punjabi ਆਪਾਂ/آپاں (āpā̃) used in Malwai, and somewhat in Puadhi dialects.) आपीं (āpī̃)	हम (ham) (Note: Here, it is simply sometimes used colloquially for "I" in place of मैं (ma͠i) (Note: Meanwhile, मैं/میں (ma͠i) is used to mean "I" in the standard register (i.e., both the Western Hindi languages as well as Pakistani and North Indian Urdu).) (it usually becomes the case of either majestic plural or nosism, or even both).) हाम (hām) हामीं (hāmī̃)	Exclusive	The clusivity is present in nearly all of Haryana, except that of Ambala, Panchkula, Yamunanagar, Karnal, Panipat, Faridabad, Palwal, etc.	Indo-European
Hindustani (Hindi-Urdu)	अपन/اپن (apan) (Note: Used only in Bombay Hindi, Hyderabadi Urdu and Dakhini.)	हम/ہم (ham) (Note: Though generally used to mean "we" in the standard register (i.e., both the Western Hindi languages as well as Pakistani and North Indian Urdu), it usually means "I" in the Eastern Hindi languages (influenced by Awadhi, Bhojpuri, Maithili, etc.). It is also sometimes used colloquially in both the Western Hindi languages as well as Pakistani and North Indian Urdu (it usually becomes the case of either majestic plural or nosism, or even both).) हम लोग/ہم لوگ (ham lōg) (Note: This is used for "we" in the Eastern Hindi languages (influenced by Awadhi, Bhojpuri, Maithili, etc.), though it becomes redundant elsewhere (especially in the standardised registers, i.e., both the Western Hindi languages as well as Pakistani and North Indian Urdu) to mean "we", and thus usually means "we (the) people".)	Exclusive	The clusivity is present only in the southern/peninsular India (including Bombay Hindi, Hyderabadi Urdu and Dakhini). It is not present in either of the standardised (ṭaksālī) registers of Hindi and Urdu.	Indo-European
Ilocano	datayó, sitayó	dakamí, sikamí	Neither	The dual inclusives datá and sitá are widely used.	Austronesian
Juǀʼhoan	mtsá (dual) m, mǃá (plural)	ètsá (dual) è, èǃá (plural)	Neither	The plural pronouns è and m are short forms.	Kxʼa
Kapampangan	ikatamu	ikami	Neither	The dual inclusive ikata is widely used.	Austronesian
Kurukh	nām	ēm	Exclusive		Dravidian
Australian Kriol	yunmi	melabat	Exclusive	The inclusive form is derived from the second-person pronoun and the first-person pronoun. The exclusive form is derived from the first-person singular and the third-person plural. There are significant dialectal and diachronic variations in the exclusive form.	English creole
Lakota	uŋ(k)-	uŋ(k)- ... -pi	Neither	The inclusive form has a dual number. By adding the suffix -pi, it takes the plural number. In the plural form, no clusivity distinction is made.	Siouan
Lojban	mi'o	mi'a/mi	Both	There is also the form ma'a, which means the speaker, the listener, and others unspecified. However, the first-person pronoun mi takes no number and can refer to any number of individuals in the same group; mi'a and mi'o are usually preferred.	Constructed language
Maguindanaon	sekitanu	sekami	Neither		Austronesian
Malagasy	Isika	Izahay	–		Austronesian
Manchu	muse	be	Exclusive		Tungusic
Malay	kita	kami	Neither	The exclusive form is hardly used in informal Indonesian in the Jakarta area. Instead, kita is almost always used colloquially to indicate both inclusive and exclusive "we". However, in more formal circumstances (both written and spoken), the distinction is clear and well-practised. Therefore, kami is absolutely exclusive, but kita may generally mean both inclusive and exclusive "we" depending on the circumstances. That phenomenon is less frequently encountered in Malaysia.	Austronesian
Malayalam	നമ്മൾ (nammaḷ)	ഞങ്ങൾ (ñaṅṅaḷ)	Exclusive		Dravidian
Mandarin	咱們 / 咱们 (zánmen)	我們 / 我们 (wǒmen)	Exclusive	我们 is used both inclusively and exclusively by most speakers, especially in formal situations. Use of 咱们 is common only in northern dialects, notably that of Beijing, and may be from Manchu influence.	Sino-Tibetan
Māori	tāua (dual) tātou (plural)	māua (dual) mātou (plural)	Neither		Austronesian
Marathi	आपण (āpaṇ)	आम्ही (āmhī)	Exclusive		Indo-European
Marwari	अपाँ (apā̃)	म्हें (mhē̃)	Exclusive		Indo-European
Southern Min	咱 (lán)	阮 (goán/gún)	Exclusive		Sino-Tibetan
Newar	झी (jhī)	जिपिं (jipiṃ)		Both are used as possessive pronouns.	Sino-Tibetan
Odia	ା/-ଆ (-ā) after ଆମେ/ଆମ୍ଭେ (āmē/āmbhē; "we")	ୁ/-ଉ (-u) after ଆମେ/ଆମ୍ଭେ (āmē/āmbhē; "we")	Exclusive	The clusivity (as described here) is indicated with "-ā" for inclusive "we", and "-u" for exclusive "we".	Indo-European
Pohnpeian	kitail (plural) kita (dual)	kiht (independent) se (subject)		There is an independent (non-verbal) and subject (verbal) pronoun distinction. The exclusive includes both dual and plural, and the independent has a dual-plural distinction.	Austronesian
Potawatomi	ginan, g- -men (short) gde- -men (long)	ninan, n- -men(short) nde- -men (long)	[?]	Potawatomi has two verb conjugation types, "short" and "long." Both are listed here and labelled as such.	Central Algonquian
Punjabi	ਆਪਾਂ/آپاں (āpā̃) (Note: Used only in Malwai, and somewhat in Puadhi dialects. Similar to Haryanvi आपाँ/आपां (āpā̃).)	ਅਸੀਂ/اسیں (asī̃) (Note: Generally used, especially in the standardised ṭaksālī Majhi register.) ਅਸਾਂ/اساں (asā̃) (Note: Used only in the Saraiki, Pahari-Pothwari and Poonchi dialects.)	Exclusive	The clusivity is present only in certain Charhda dialects (such as Malwai, Puadhi). It is not present in the standardised (ṭaksālī) Majhi register, as well as in the Lahnda, Poonchi, Pahari-Pothwari, and other Charhda dialects (such as Doabi, Pahari). Meanwhile, both the Raiboli and Saraiki dialects are a mixed bag.	Indo-European
Quechuan languages	ñuqanchik	ñuqayku	Both		Quechuan
Shawnee	kiilawe	niilawe	Exclusive	The inclusive form is morphologically derived from the second-person pronoun kiila.	Algic
Tagalog	táyo	kamí	Neither		Austronesian
Tausug	kitaniyu	kami	??	The dual inclusive is kita.	Austronesian
Tamil	நாம் (nām)	நாங்கள் (nāṅkaḷ)	Both		Dravidian
Telugu	మనము (manamu)	మేము (memu)	Exclusive		Dravidian
Tetum	ita	ami	Neither		Austronesian
Tok Pisin	yumipela	mipela	Exclusive	The inclusive form is derived from the second-person pronoun and the first-person pronoun. There are also dual and trial forms.	English creole
Tupi	îandé	oré	Inclusive		Tupi-Guarani
Tulu	nama	yenkul			Dravidian
Udmurt	as'meos (асьмеос) ваньмы ("we all together")	mi (ми)	Exclusive	The form as'meos seems to become obsolete and 'mi' is always used instead by younger generations, probably under the influence of Russian 'my' (мы) for 'we'.	Permic
Vietnamese	chúng ta	chúng tôi	Exclusive	The exclusive form is derived from the formal form of I, tôi	Austroasiatic

== Citations ==
=== Further reading ===
- Jim Chen, First Person Plural (analyzing the significance of inclusive and exclusive we in constitutional interpretation)
- Payne, Thomas E. (1997), Describing morphosyntax: A guide for field linguists, Cambridge University Press, ISBN 0-521-58224-5
- Filimonova, Elena (eds). (2005). Clusivity: Typological and case studies of the inclusive-exclusive distinction. Amsterdam: John Benjamins Publishing Company. ISBN 90-272-2974-0.
- Kibort, Anna. "Person." Grammatical Features. 7 January 2008. Retrieved on 16 March 2020.

=== External links ===
- The dictionary definition of clusivity at Wiktionary
