= Nezapir =

Pakistani village

Nezapir نیزا پیر
- Country: Pakistan
- Territory: Azad Kashmir
- District: Haveli

Nezapir (Urdu: نیزا پیر also spelled Neza Pir, Neza Peer and Nezapeer) or Nezapir sector is a village area located in the Haveli District of Azad Kashmir. It has an estimated population of about 112,000.

== Conflict ==
Nezapir sector is located near the Line of Control, and for several years, has been an area of strife between the two neighboring countries, Pakistan and India.
