= Trar Dewan, Rawalakot =

Village in Azad Kashmir, Pakistan

Trar Dewan (Urdu: تراڑ دیوان) is a village in Poonch District, Azad Kashmir, Pakistan. Found to the south of Rawalakot, it is one of many suburban villages surrounding the city.

== Demography ==
The village has a population of around 10,000 people, who belong to various tribes such as the Sudhan, Quraishi, Khwaja, Mangral, Sulehria, Dhund, Gakhars and Dar.

== Education ==
The village's means of education consist of 2 middle schools, Poonch Medical College, a government run polytechnic institute, and the nearby University of Poonch. Approximately 90% of the population are educated. Graduates include doctors, engineers, professors and businessmen.
