= Poonch Medical College =

Medical college in Azad Kashmir, Pakistan

- پونچھ میڈیکل کالج
- Former name: Ghazi e Millat Sardar Muhammad Ibrahim Medical College Poonch
- Motto: Minds that Care and Cure
- Type: Public medical college
- Established: 2012
- Affiliations: Pakistan Medical And Dental Council
- Academic affiliations: University of Health Sciences Lahore
- Principal: Prof Dr. Mumtaz Ahmed Khan (T.I)
- Academic staff: 39 (2021)
- Students: 583 (2021)
- Location: Trar Dewan, Rawalakot, Poonch District, Azad Kashmir, Pakistan; 33.836312°N 73.771298°E
- Campus: ~16; Urban
- Language: English
- Colours: Sky Blue and White
- Nickname: PMCR
- Website: http://pmcrajk.edu.pk/

Poonch Medical College (Urdu: پونچھ طبی کالج) is a public sector medical college established in 2012, located in Trar Dewan, in suburban Rawalakot, Poonch District, Azad Kashmir, Pakistan. The college is affiliated with the University of Health Sciences Lahore, and the Pakistan Medical and Dental Council. Three hospitals i.e Shaikh Khalifa Bin Zayed Hospital in Rawalakot, DHQ Bagh and T.H.Q. Hospital in Hajira with cumulative 700 beds capacity are affiliated with college as Teaching Hospital. Another Teaching Hospital of 200 beds are under construction at Chak Dhamni Rawalakot.

== History ==
The Medical College

The Medical college was established in 2012, comprising a faculty of 11 professors and 18 assistant professors, with 62 students enrolling. Studies began in April 2013, with the first class graduating in 2018. Previous principals of the college include Dr Zia-Ur Rehman, Prof. Dr. Shabeer Ahmed Chudhry, and Dr Azhar Qayyum.

The Nursing College

The Nursing college of Poonch Medical college established in 2025.

== Principals ==
Principals
S#	Name	Qualification	Tenure
1	Prof Dr Zia Ur Rehman	MBBS, FCPS (Surgery)	2013-2018
2	Dr Shabbir Ahmad Chaudhary (Acting)	MBBS, M. Phil (Anatomy)	2018-2019
3	Prof Dr Azhar Qayyum	MBBS M.Phil, Ph.D (Morbid Anatomy/Histopathology)	2019-2023
4	Dr Shabbir Ahmad Chaudhary (Acting)	MBBS, M. Phil (Anatomy)	2023-2024
5	Prof Dr. Mumtaz Ahmed Khan (T.I)	MBBS M.Phil, Ph.D (Pathology)	2024- todate

== Academics ==
Poonch Medical College offers a course for a Bachelor of Medicine, Bachelor of Surgery (MBBS) degree. Its academic departments include Anatomy, Physiology, Biochemistry, Pathology, Pharmacology, Community Medicine, Medical Education, Surgery & Allied, Radiology, Orthopedic Surgery, Urology, Medicine & Allied, Gastroenterology, Psychiatry, Cardiology, Gynaecology and obstetrics, Ophthalmology, ENT, and Pediatrics.

In 2017, the college was ranked first in merit among all affiliates of the University of Health Sciences Lahore in the MBBS exams.

== Campus ==
As of December 2024 Poonch Medical College lacks its own campus and allied facilities and is currently using a facility belonging to a government run polytechnic institute.

== Student Life ==
Notable student unions of the college include Gilgit Baltistan Medicos Union, and Medical Students' Association of Pakistan and SYNCH. Various societies exist on subjects such as literature, sports, and blood donation; among others.

Students from Poonch Medical College Rawalakot are active in research

== Recognition ==
Other than its affiliates, Poonch Medical College is recognized by the World Health Organization and is listed in the World Directory of Medical Schools.

== See also ==
- List of institutions of higher education in Azad Kashmir
- List of medical schools in Pakistan
