= Barmang =

Town in Azad Kashmir, Pakistan

Coordinates: 33°51′N 73°50′E

Barmang برمنگ
- Town
- Interactive map of Barmang
- Country: Pakistan
- Territory: Azad Kashmir
- District: Poonch District

Barmang is a town in Rawalakot tehsil of Poonch District, Azad Kashmir, Pakistan and it split in two parts, Barmang Khurd and Barmang Kalan, it has an elevation of 1,736 metres. Barmang is situated nearby to Army Area and the town Khai Gala. The primary spoken language is the local dialect of Pahari.

== Geography ==
Barmang is situated in the mountainous terrain of Poonch, surrounded by pine forests and fertile valleys. It is located approximately 5 km from Khai Gala and lies en route to Trarkhal. The area experiences a moderate climate with snowfall in winter and mild summers.

== History ==
Barmang is part of the Sudhan heartland, and its residents played a notable role in the 1837 Poonch Revolt against Dogra rule, led by Sudhan leaders. People from the area were also involved in the 1947 Poonch Uprising, contributing to the liberation movement in Azad Kashmir.

== Education ==
The village lies near Musa Khan Public School, now part of the Read Foundation Girls School Khai Gala, founded by Musa Khan, a British Indian Army veteran from the area.
