= Nar Sher Ali Khan =

Coordinates: 33°56′N 73°56′E

- Union council
- Interactive map of Nar Sher Ali Khan
- Country: Pakistan
- Region: Jammu and Kashmir
- District: Bagh

Population
  - Total: 30,000
- Time zone: UTC+5 (PST)

Nar Sher Ali Khan is a union council of Bagh District, Azad Kashmir.
