= 2023 India–Pakistan border skirmishes =

Border clashes between India and Pakistan

- Part of the Kashmir conflict
- Location: Sattwal, Poonch, Azad Kashmir
- Date: 24 June 2023
- Attack type: Shooting
- Deaths: 2 killed, 1 critically injured

On 24 June 2023, Pakistan claimed that Indian soldiers fired across the line of control (LoC) in the Sattwal sector of the Poonch District of the Pakistani-controlled disputed territory of Azad Jammu and Kashmir, killing two shepherds and critically injuring one. It was the first instance of the February 2021 LoC truce being violated.

== Victims ==
Three casualties were reported by the ISPR; Obaid Qayyum (22), Muhammad Qasim (55), and a third individual who was not identified. They were residents of Tatrinote Village near Hajira.

== Reactions ==
Pakistan's Ministry of Foreign Affairs summoned the Indian Chargé d'affaires to lodge a protest in which it demanded the Indian government to open an investigation and respect the ceasefire to maintain peace on the LoC. Moreover, the Pakistan Armed Forces also stated "While a strong protest is being launched with the Indian side, Pakistan reserves the right to respond back in manner of its choosing to protect Kashmiri lives in the LOC belt" warning the Indian side of a retaliation if the need arises.

The Prime Minister of Azad Kashmir, Chaudhry Anwarul Haq, accused India of terrorism and aggression, and called for the United Nations to take notice.

India did not immediately respond to the allegations, nor to a request for comment from Reuters.

== See also ==
- Border shooting of Felani Khatun
- 2025 India–Pakistan crisis
