= Toli Pir, Rawalakot =

Place in Kashmir

Tolipir تولی پیر
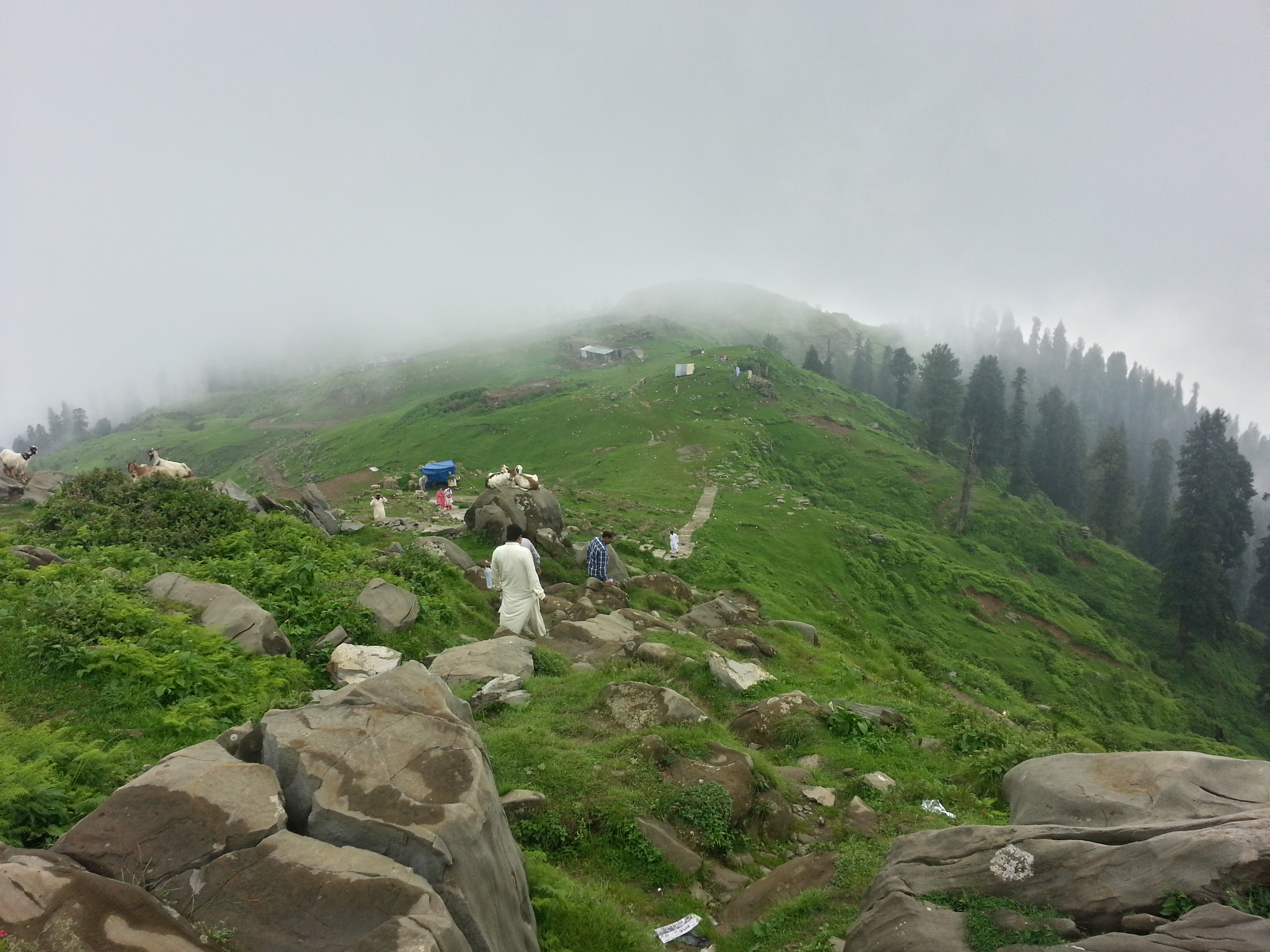
- View of Toli Pir top

- Location within Azad Kashmir Location within Kashmir Location within Pakistan
- Coordinates: 33.882997434659735°N 73.82446113027662°E
- Country: Pakistan
- Administrative Territory: Azad Kashmir
- District: Poonch District
- Tehsil: Rawalakot
- Elevation: 2,743 m (8,999 ft)
- Time zone: UTC+5 (Pakistan Standard Time)
- Postal code: 12350

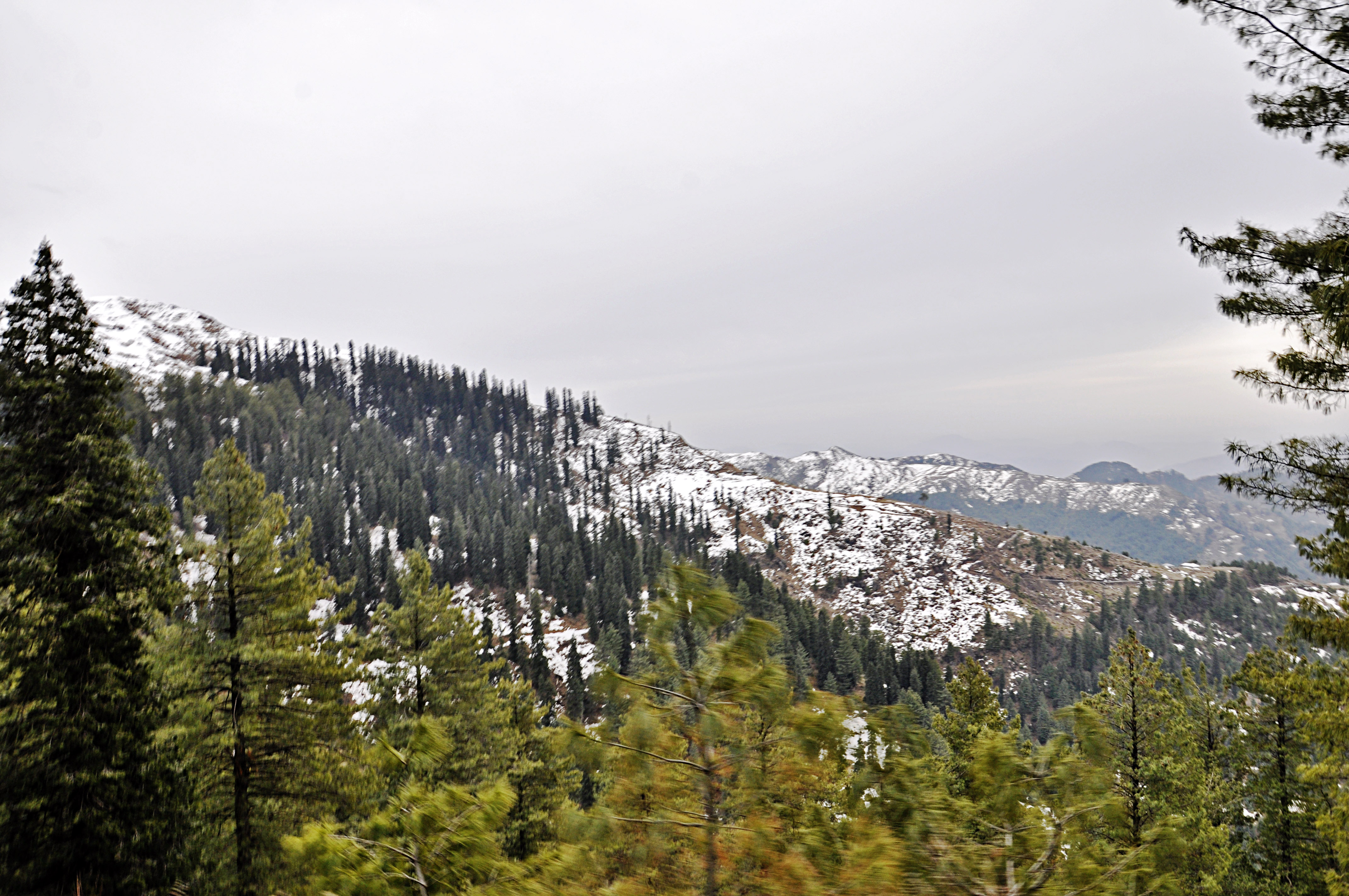
Toli Pir top

Toli Pir (Urdu: تولی پیر) is a hilltop area situated in Rawalakot Tehsil in the Poonch District of Azad Kashmir, Pakistan. Its approximate elevation is about 2,743 m (8,999 ft) above sea level. It is about 30 km, or a 120-minute drive, from Rawalakot in Azad Kashmir. Abbaspur, Bagh, and Poonch River can be viewed from Toli Pir. It is a popular tourist destination in the region, attracting thousands in the summer months.

Tolipir is the highest mountainous location in the north-eastern area of Rawalakot; it is the point of origin of three different mountain ridges. The tourist rest house on the way to Toli Pir is also situated in a scenic location. There are some remains of an old Sufi shrine on the highest hilltop.

Tolipir is most accessible during the summer months; the weather generally becomes colder from October through March, with snowfall usually expected.

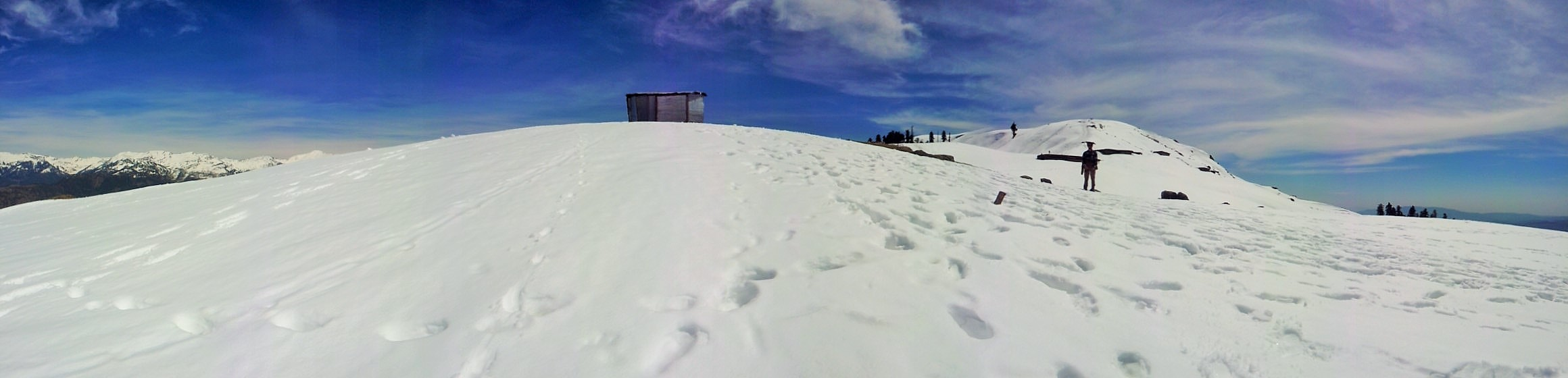
Toli Pir in winter

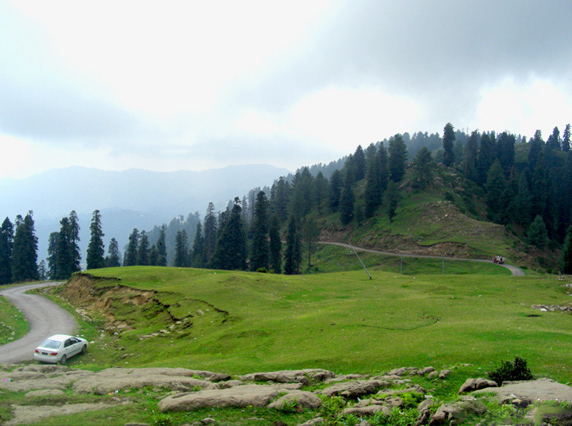
View of Toli Pir
