= Sirsyedan =

Town in Azad Kashmir, Pakistan

Sirsyedan is a town located in the south-west of Bagh District, a district in Azad Kashmir, Pakistan.
