= Pahari (Poonchi) =

Indo-Aryan language of Pakistan and India

Poonchi Pahari
- Pahari (Poonchi)
- پونچھی پہاڑی, Punchhī Pahāṛī
- Native to: Pakistan (Kashmir), India (Jammu and Kashmir)
- Region: Poonch Division in Kashmir; Poonch District in Jammu and Kashmir
- Language family: Indo-European: Indo-Iranian; Indo-Aryan; Northwestern; Punjabic; Lahnda; Pahari-Pothwari; Poonchi Pahari
- Writing system: Shahmukhi, Takri

Language codes
- ISO 639-3: phr
- Glottolog: punc1239

Pahari (Poonchi) or Poonchi Pahari (Urdu: پونچھی پہاڑی) is a dialect of the Indo-Aryan Pahari-Pothwari group, spoken primarily in the Poonch Division of Pakistani-administered Kashmir and the Poonch District of Indian-administered Jammu and Kashmir. It is considered part of the Lahnda (Western Punjabi) dialect continuum, and is closely related to Hindko and Pothohari.

== Classification ==
Linguists classify Poonchi Pahari under the Indo-European > Indo-Iranian > Indo-Aryan > Northwestern > Punjabic > Lahnda > Pahari-Pothwari > Punchic branch. Alongside Poonchi, the dialects of Shah-Mansuri, Zaghloli and Zirak-Boli also fall under the Punchic classification. Poonchi Pahari is mutually intelligible with neighboring Pahari dialects such as the Mirpuri dialect and Kotli Pahari, which are often grouped locally as part of a singular "Pahari" language.

== Distribution and speakers ==
The dialect is spoken primarily in Pakistani-administered Kashmir's Poonch Division, which comprises the districts of Poonch, Bagh, Sudhanoti, and Haveli. Additionally, it is also spoken in Indian-administered Jammu and Kashmir's Poonch District.

There is also a smaller diaspora of Poonchi and broader Pahari speakers in the United Kingdom, together estimated at over 0.1 million.

== Phonology and grammar ==
Poonchi Pahari features a rich phonological inventory. One study found 30 consonants, 12 oral vowels, 4 nasalized vowels, and 6 diphthongs in Pahari as spoken in Bagh District, part of the Poonch Division in Pakistan Administred Kashmir. Stress is non-contrastive and syllable structure resembles that of Punjabi and Hindko.

The language follows the typical subject–object–verb structure of Indo-Aryan languages. It makes use of postpositions, auxiliary verbs, and aspect-based verb stems.

== Vocabulary and influence ==
The vocabulary is largely Indo-Aryan in origin, with substantial influence from Urdu, Persian, Punjabi, and English. Daily speech frequently incorporates Urdu and English terms, especially among younger speakers.

== Script ==
Poonchi Pahari is written informally in the Shahmukhi script, which is the Perso-Arabic script also used for Punjabi and related varieties (including Pahari–Pothwari) in Pakistant Administred Kashmir, However, being an indo-aryan in origin language, the ancient script has been Takri as other pahari scripts found in Himachal and Jammu & kashmir region of India, which was lost in time.

== Status and language shift ==
Some sociolinguists consider Poonchi Pahari to be a threatened or endangered language, due to its limited presence in education, media, and government. Younger speakers in Pakistand Administred Kashmir are increasingly shifting toward Urdu and English for economic and social mobility.

Despite this, revitalization efforts are underway. The Government of Kashmir, Pakistan the University of Jammu and Kashmir, Pakistan and the Allama Iqbal Open University have supported academic research into the preservation and documentation of the Pahari languages of Kashmir.
