= Las Danna =

- Tourist Resort
- Location within Pakistan
- Coordinates: 33.9212°N 73.9550°E
- Country: Pakistan
- State: Azad Kashmir
- District: Bagh
- Elevation: 2,625 m (8,612 ft)

Languages
  - Official: Urdu
- Time zone: PST

Las Danna is a tourist resort in Bagh District, Azad Kashmir, Pakistan. It is located 15 kilometers (9.3 mi) from Bagh city at the height of 8,612 feet (2,625 m). A tourist rest house is located here.
