= Forward Kahuta =

City and District Headquarters in Azad Jammu and Kashmir

Forward Kahuta فارورڈ کہوٹہ
- City and District Headquarters
- Location of Forward Kahuta Forward Kahuta (Pakistan)
- Coordinates: 33°53′02″N 74°06′15″E
- Administering country: Pakistan
- Dependent Territory: Azad Kashmir
- District: Haveli
- Time zone: UTC+5 (PST)

Forward Kahuta (Urdu: فارورڈ کہوٹہ, original name: Kahuta) is a town and the district headquarters of the Haveli District in Azad Kashmir, Pakistan. The district was formed in 2009 by separating it from Bagh District. The name "Forward Kahuta" has been used from the 1990s, prior to which the town was known simply as "Kahuta".

== Geography ==
Forward Kahuta is on the right bank of Betar Nala, about 10 miles north of the Poonch Town (in Indian-administered Kashmir), where the Betar Nala drains into the Poonch River (in Indian-administered Kashmir). It lies on a rich plateau 200 ft. above the river level, en route to the Haji Pir pass, and to the Uri town beyond.

The Haveli district of Azad Kashmir, lying between the Uri and Poonch towns, is strategic. It changed hands between India and Pakistan multiple times since 1947, but nevertheless remained under Pakistani control. It is known in India as "Haji Pir bulge" and sometimes as "Kahuta bulge".

The Bagh town, the headquarters of the Bagh District, is 65 km from Forward Kahuta, whereas Rawalakot, the headquarters of the Pakistani Poonch District is 100 km away.

== History ==
Choudhary Muhammad Aziz Chohan is founder of this district. Historically this place was very important for all those emperor's that would wanted to establish their empire on the Northern areas and other parts of Kashmir. At that time the main power on this region was the Tanoli tribe (descendants of Khilji) and their state Amb Darband ruled by Malik Abdul Qadir (founder of free Amb Movement after independence), great-grandfather Mir Jehandad Khan Tanoli, was a tribal chief of the Tanoli people and the state headquarter was in Darband.

The Poonch region became part of the Sikh Empire in 1819. Maharaja Ranjit Singh gave it as a jagir to Raja Dhyan Singh, his favoure Dogra diwan. Dhyan Singh and his descendants administered the region till the Partition of India in 1947. However, the maharajas of Jammu and Kashmir, who became the suzerains of the Poonch jagir after 1846, exerted increasing control over the region towards the end of the period.

Raja Baldev Singh constructed a road from Poonch to the Haji Pir pass via Kahuta, along with a suspension bridge over the Betar Nala near the town. Later it appears to have been upgraded to a wooden bridge. It was burnt down by the Jammu and Kashmir State Forces stationed at Poonch during the Indo-Pakistani War of 1947, mistaking an Indian relief column sent via Uri to be an enemy attack. Nevertheless, a portion of the column under the command of Pritam Singh reached Poonch and helped the town survive the siege although Kahuta itself ultimately fell under Pakistani control.
