= Gilgit Baltistan Medicos Union =

GBMU
- Gilgit Baltistan Medicos Union
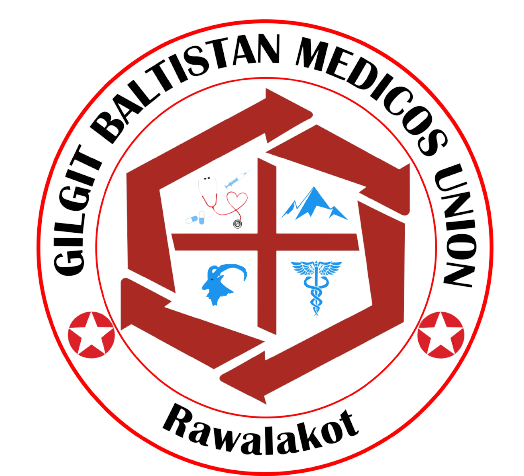
- Established: April 29, 2019; 7 years ago
- Type: Student Organization
- Legal status: Union
- Headquarters: Poonch Medical College
- Chairman: Yaseer Ahmad
- General Secretary: Faryal Yousaf
- Management Head: Mohsin Iqbal
- Finance Head: Yasmeen
- Affiliations: Poonch Medical College
- Funding: Membership Fee

Gilgit-Baltistan Medico's Union (GBMU) is a representative organization of doctors studying in medical colleges in Azad Kashmir from Gilgit-Baltistan. It was established on 23 April 2019 in Rawalakot, Azad Kashmir. The main objectives of this organization are to create harmony and consensus among medical students from Gilgit-Baltistan studying in Azad Kashmir and to protect their interests.

== Constitution approval ==
The constitution of the organization was finally approved at a meeting held in Rawalakot city on 22 September 22, 2020.

== Related Articles ==
- Poonch Medical College
- Gilgit Baltistan
- Azad Kashmir
- Azad Jammu Kashmir Medical College
