= Nosism =

Practice of using "we" to refer to a singular subject

Nosism (from Latin nos 'we') is the practice of using the plural pronoun we to refer to a singular subject, particularly when expressing one's personal opinion.

Depending on the person using the nosism, different uses can be distinguished:

== Types ==
=== The royal we or pluralis majestatis ===
The royal we (pluralis majestatis) refers to a single person holding a high office, such as a monarch, bishop, or pope.

=== The editorial we ===
The editorial we is a similar phenomenon, in which an editorial columnist in a newspaper or a similar commentator in another medium uses we when giving their opinion. Here, the writer is self-cast in the role of a spokesperson: either for the media institution that employs them, or more generally on behalf of the party or body of citizens who agree with the commentary.

=== The author's we or pluralis modestiae ===
Similar to the editorial we, pluralis modestiae is the practice common in mathematical and scientific literature of referring to a generic third person by we (instead of the more common one or the informal you):

- "By adding four and five, we obtain nine."
- "We are thus led also to a definition of time in physics."—Albert Einstein

We in this sense often refers to "the reader and the author", since the author often assumes that the reader knows and agrees with certain principles or previous theorems for the sake of brevity (or, if not, the reader is prompted to look them up).

This practice is discouraged in the natural and formal sciences, social sciences, humanities, and technical writing because it fails to distinguish between sole authorship and co-authorship.

=== The patronizing we ===
The patronizing we (also known as the kindergarten or preschool we) is sometimes used in addressing instead of you, suggesting that the addressee is not alone in their situation such as "We won't lose our mittens today." This usage can carry condescending, ironic, praising, or other connotations, depending on intonation.

=== The hospital we ===
This is sometimes employed by healthcare workers when addressing their patients; for example, "How are we feeling today?"

=== The non-confrontative we ===
The non-confrontative we is used in T–V languages such as Spanish where the phrase ¿Cómo estamos? (literally, 'How are we?') is sometimes used to avoid both over-familiarity and under-formality among near-peer acquaintances. In Spanish, the indicative we form is also often used instead of the imperative for giving instructions, such as in recipes: batimos las claras a punto de nieve ('we beat the egg whites until stiff').

In English slang, we can be used to rhetorically confront a situation; by using it, the speaker can evoke a sense of experiencing the situation together with the potential listener while avoiding the paradox of addressing the non-addressable (such as an unlucky occurrence) with you.
