= JEN (charity) =

Japanese humanitarian aid organisation

JEN, formerly named Japan Emergency NGO, was established in January 1994 as the first federation of Japanese NGOs.

== History ==
By working and pulling together the expertise of human and financial resources across several NGOs, it became feasible to carry out a project which otherwise could have been difficult by a single NGO. It also aimed for a more collaborative form of humanitarian assistance with the cooperation of Japanese government and UN organisations.

Since May 1994, 14 offices were established in different areas in Serbia, Croatia, Bosnia & Herzegovina and Montenegro with international staff delegated to each office to start the refugee and internally displaced persons assistance activities. The activity of JEN in the former Yugoslavia, which has once started as a half-year project, grew from emergency relief to rehabilitation over the years. In 2004, all directly implemented projects ended in the former Yugoslavia and were handed over to local NGOs.

After the 2011 Tōhoku earthquake and tsunami, JEN's teams of volunteers spread out in Ishinomaki to dig out houses and people from the debris. They also worked on rebuilding houses. In 2012, the company Uniqlo invested $300 million in a group of 5 NGOs, including JEN, to support their projects.

In March 2016, JEN received the authorization to operate in Pakistan.

In October 2017, in collaboration with the Ford Foundation, JEN launched three agricultural projects in Sri Lanka to reboot the local economy after the Civil War.

== Projects ==
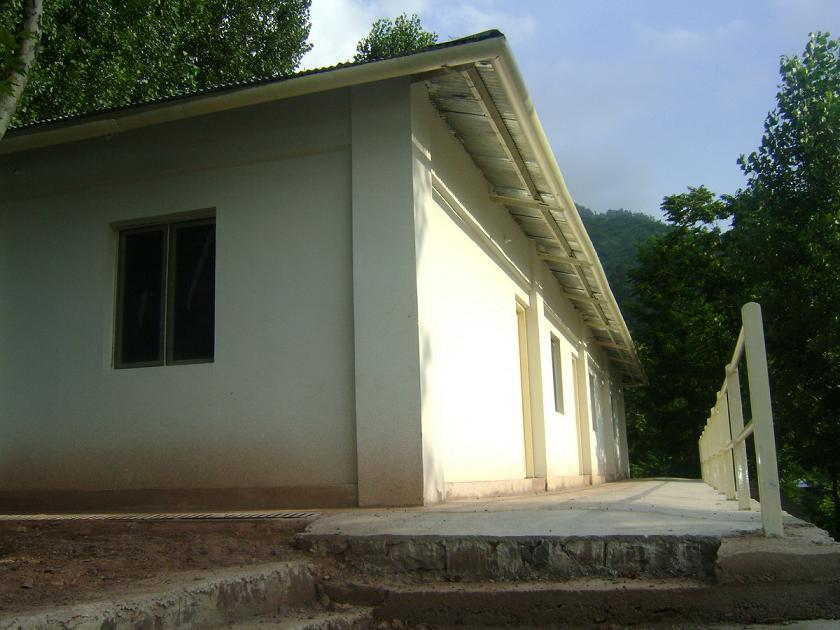
JEN School in Bagh AJK

At present, JEN works in seven countries including Afghanistan, Pakistan, Sri Lanka, Iraq, Sudan, Myanmar, and Niigata, Japan and our projects differ ranging from providing rehabilitation of schools in Iraq and Afghanistan from livelihood programme in Sri Lanka. JEN worked for the victims of 2005 earthquake in District Bagh, Kashmir, Pakistan
