= Khai Gala =

Coordinates: 33°51′N 73°50′E

Khaigala کھائیگلا
- Town
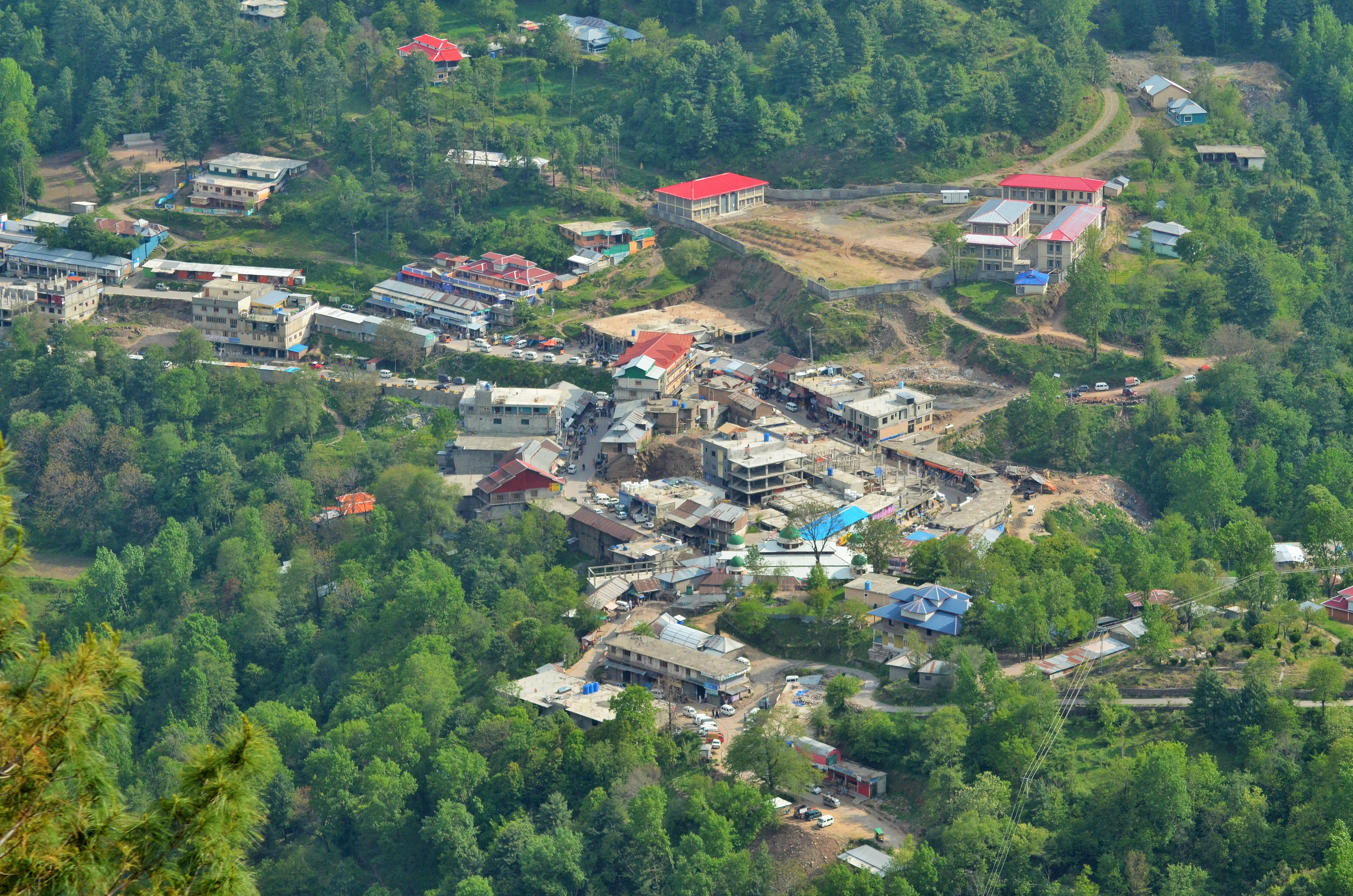
- Skyline of Khaigala
- Interactive map of Khaigala
- Country: Pakistan
- Territory: Azad Kashmir

Khaigala (also spelled Khai Gala) is a town in Rawalakot Tehsil, Poonch District, Azad Kashmir, Pakistan. It lies near Rawalakot city and is surrounded by villages such as Barmang and Ali Sojal.

== Geography and Demographics ==
Khaigala is situated in the Pir Panjal Range, at an elevation of about 1,600 m.

=== Role in 1947 Poonch Rebellion ===
Khaigala was a significant conflict site during the 1947 Poonch rebellion, which led to the creation of Azad Jammu and Kashmir. According to Sardar Ibrahim Khan, the first President of Azad Kashmir, the first armed conflict with the Dogra forces occurred at the town of Khaigala.

== Education and Institutions ==
Khaigala is home to several schools and colleges.

== Notable people ==
- Sardar Muhammad Yaqoob Khan – former President of Azad Jammu and Kashmir.
