= Hajira, Poonch =

Hajira, Poonch ہجیرہ Hajeera
- Town
- Location within Azad Kashmir
- Coordinates: 33.7717°N 73.8961°E
- Country: Pakistan
- State: Azad Kashmir
- District: Poonch District
- Elevation: 966 m (3,169 ft)

Population (2017)
  - Total: 28,953

Languages
  - Official: Urdu
- Time zone: PST

Hajira (Urdu: ہجیرہ) is a small town in Poonch District of Azad Jammu and Kashmir, Pakistan. It is the headquarters of Hajira Tehsil, also known as 'Cheara' in local accents. Hajira is a transport hub, as the center point of different districts. Hajira Ponch is correctly interpreted as ‘Hajira Reach’.

== Geography ==
South of Hajira is Sudhnoti district. Southeast of Hajira is Kotli district. To the north is Haveli district. Bagh district is west of Hajira. Khai Gala and Rawalakot are the other nearest cities of Hajira and located west of Hajira. Hajira is close to the Pakistan/India border. The town is situated on the bank of a river (which feeds into the Poonch river in a narrow valley surrounded by hills. It is the nearest major town to the line of control.

== Administration ==
Hajira is one of four tehsils of Poonch district. It is a sub-divisional headquarter of Poonch district of Azad Kashmir. The main villages included in sub-division Hajira are: Ghameer, Pothi Chhaprian, Kathiara, Paghwati, Dawarandi, Tatrinote, Madarpur, Saher, Mandhol, Buttle, Sahra, Dara sher khan, Rakar, Sarari, Basari, Kaloti, Devigali, kalpur, Bhango, Bhantini, etc. The tehsil has seven union councils:

- Ghameer
- Bahnteeni
- Jandali
- Serari
- Narrian Kathrria
- Raker
- Phagwati
- Sahir Kakuta

=== Climate ===
Summers can be hot (exceeding 35C), while winters are mild, with the low altitude making snowfall rare.

== Demographics ==
The language spoken in Hajira is Urdu, similar to the west side of Hajira. Northwords to Tata Pani the language becomes Pahari and Potwari. The Indian borders and line of control LOC is near Hajira. Residents include Soduzai Pathans, Awans, Khwajas, Janjua Rajputs, Dullies, Jaats, Gujars, Ghakhars, Mughals, and Qureshis. The literacy rate is almost 60%..

== Facilities ==
Health and Education institutes are available.

Hotels and guest houses are located for tourists stay. The town is covered by all GSM operators. Markets in Hajira include the Main Bazar, Serari Bazar, Dak-khaana Market, Thana Road Market, Pull Bazar, Bypass road market, 'College chowk Market, and Petrol Pump Market.

== Transport ==
Hajira has road connections with Rawalakot, Kotli and Trarkhel. Public transport runs daily between Rawalakot and Hajira.

== History ==
Hajira and surrounding areas have faced trouble because of proximity to the line of control. Because of the Indo–Pak agreement, cross border attacks from India had stopped and Hajira had become safer. But recently during May, 2025 India targeted the City and other areas during the Operation Sindoor.Lots of people martyred during the attacks. Besides this, 2005 earthquake has also affected the area and people.

== Education ==
A Government Boys Degree College and a Government Girls Degree College as well as private colleges, such as Muhammadan Science College Stars Science College' Islamia Science College.
