= Haveli District =

District in Azad Kashmir, Pakistan

Haveli District ضلع حویلی
- District of Azad Kashmir administered by Pakistan
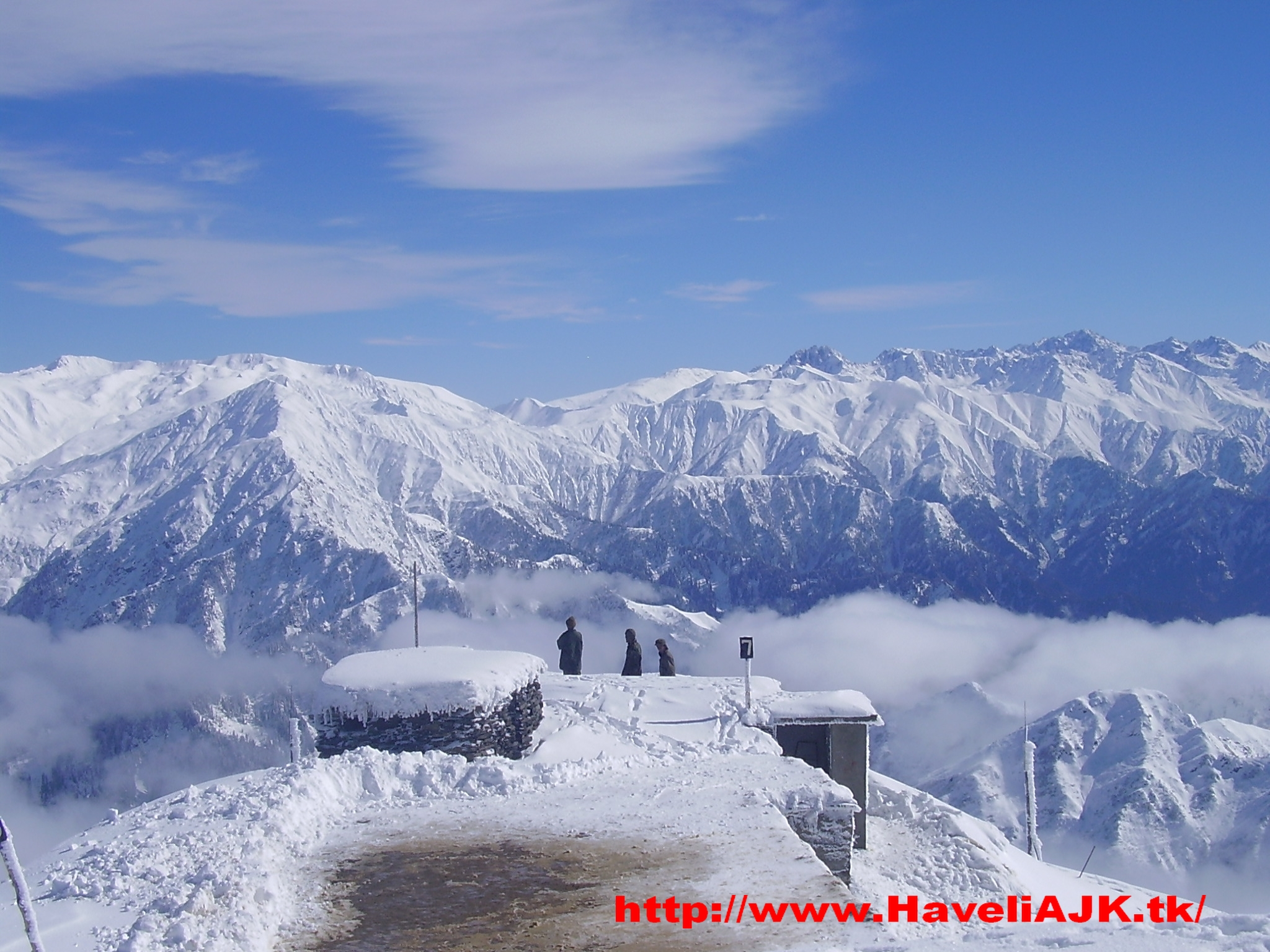
- Haveli Kahutta

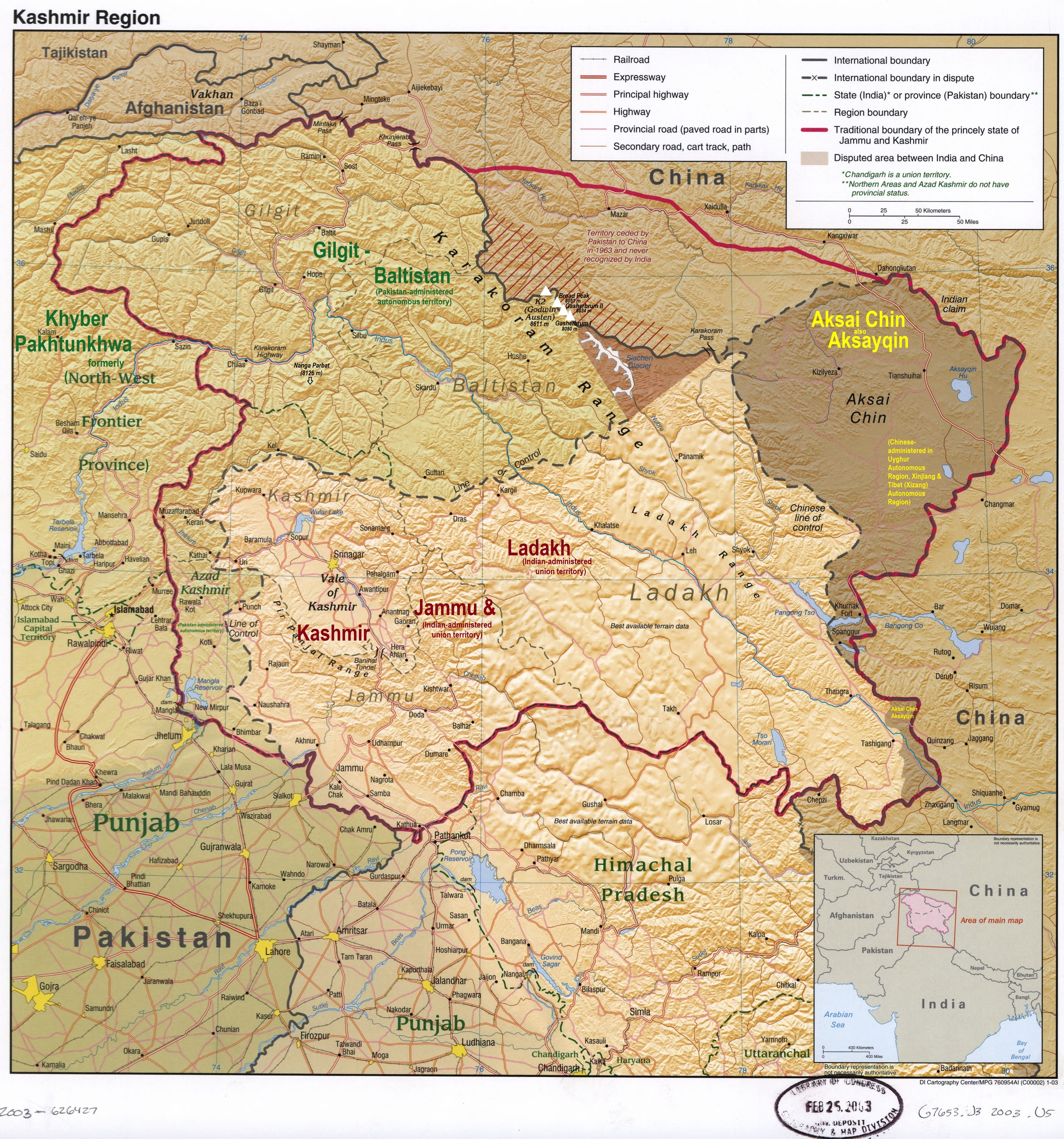
- A map showing Pakistani-administered Pakistan Administered Kashmir (shaded in sage green) in the disputed Kashmir region
- Interactive map of Haveli District
- Coordinates (Forward Kahuta): 33°56′N 74°06′E
- Administering country: Pakistan
- Territory: Azad Kashmir
- Division: Poonch Division
- Headquarters: Forward Kahuta

Government
  - Type: District Administration
  - Deputy Commissioner: N/A
  - District Police Officer: N/A
  - District Health Officer: N/A

Area
  - Total: 598 km^{2} (231 sq mi)

Population (2017)
  - Total: 152,124
  - Density: 268/km^{2} (690/sq mi)

Languages
  - Official: Urdu
  - Spoken: Pahari, Gujari, Kashmiri
- Number of Tehsils: 3

The Haveli District (Urdu: ضلع حویلی) is a district of Pakistan-administered Azad Kashmir in the disputed Kashmir region. It is one of the 10 districts of the Pakistan-administered territory of Azad Kashmir. It was previously a tehsil of the Bagh District but was promoted to the district status on 1 July 2009.

Map of Azad Kashmir with the Haveli District highlighted in red

== Demographics ==
According to the 2017 census, the district has a population of 152,124.

=== Social groups ===
Gujjar is a major ethnic group in Haveli District, making up around 30% of the district's population, which is approximately 45,637 people. Other ethnic groups in the district are Pahari, Kashmiri, Sayed, and Pashtuns.

=== Language ===
Pahari and Gujari are two major languages of Havel District. Chibali Pahari is a spoken 65%, Gujari spoken by 30% and Kashmiri by 5% of district's population.

1. Pahari (Chibali) (65.0%)
2. Gujari (Gojri) (30.0%)
3. Kashmiri (5.00%)

== Tourism ==
Haveli District has many tourism places such as:

1. Neelfairy (or Neilferi) 2. Hillan Waterfall 3. Mathatika 4. Sankh Meadows 5. Badori 6. Mahmood Gali 7. Darra Haji Peer 8. Lasdana 9. Sharu Dhara 10. Mangi Shaheed 11. Kalamula 12. Pajja Gali 13. pahala waterfall (Kalamula) 14.khariyan waterfall( UC Keerni Mandhar) 15.Rani Bagh 16. jabbi syedyan 17.bringbun and many more un explore tourist spots

== Administration ==
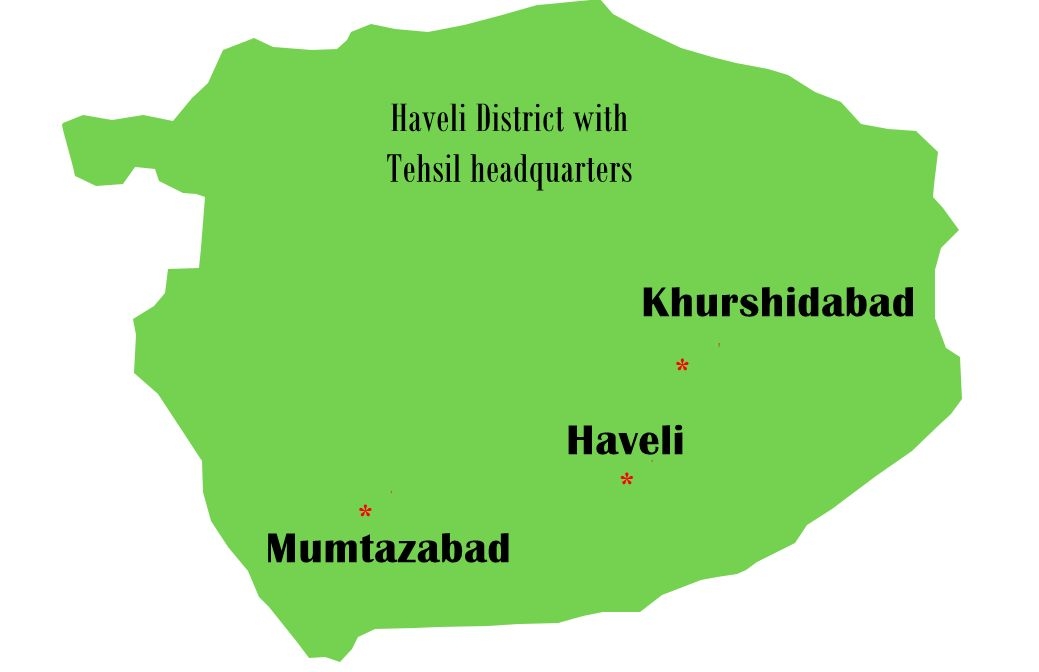
Map of Haveli District with tehsil headquarters highlighted

The Haveli District is divided into three tehsils:

- Haveli Tehsil
- Khurshidabad Tehsil
- Mumtazabad Tehsil

The district has 12 union councils consisting of 95 villages and one municipal corporation, Forward Kahuta.

== Geography ==
The Haveli District is situated at a high altitude of approximately 2,438.4 m above sea level. Heavy snowfall occurs regularly throughout the year. Darra Haji Peer, Lasdana, Sindhgala, Neel Kunth, Aliabad, Sheraziabad, Kalamula, Jabbi Syedan, Hallan Jaunbi and Mohri Syed Ali are all well known tourist locations. The Bedori Top, at 3,727 m, is the highest peak in the district.

The Haveli District is bounded on the north and north-east by the Baramulla District of Indian-administered Jammu and Kashmir, on the south-east and south by the Poonch District of Indian-administered Jammu and Kashmir, and on the west by the Bagh District and the Poonch District of Azad Kashmir.

The Poonch region became part of the Sikh Empire in 1819 despite fierce resistance by the local mountain tribes. Maharaja Ranjit Singh gave it as a jagir to Raja Dhyan Singh, his Dogra wazir. Dhyan Singh and his descendants administered the region till the Partition of India in 1947. However, the maharajas of Jammu and Kashmir, who became the suzerains of the Poonch jagir after 1846, exerted increasing control over the region towards the end of the period.

Raja Baldev Singh constructed a road from Poonch to the Haji Pir pass via Kahuta, along with a suspension bridge over the Betar Nala near the town.[3] Later it appears to have been upgraded to a wooden bridge. It was burnt down by the Jammu and Kashmir State Forces stationed at Poonch during the Indo-Pakistani War of 1947, mistaking an Indian relief column sent via Uri to be an enemy attack. Nevertheless, a portion of the column under the command of Pritam Singh reached Poonch and helped the town survive the siege. This, however, led to the capture of this district by the Azad Kashmir Regular Force and its subsequent incorporation into Pakistan as part of the Azad Kashmir self-governing region.[4]
