= Abbaspur Tehsil =

Tehsil in Azad Kashmir, Pakistan

Abbaspur عباس پور
- Tehsil
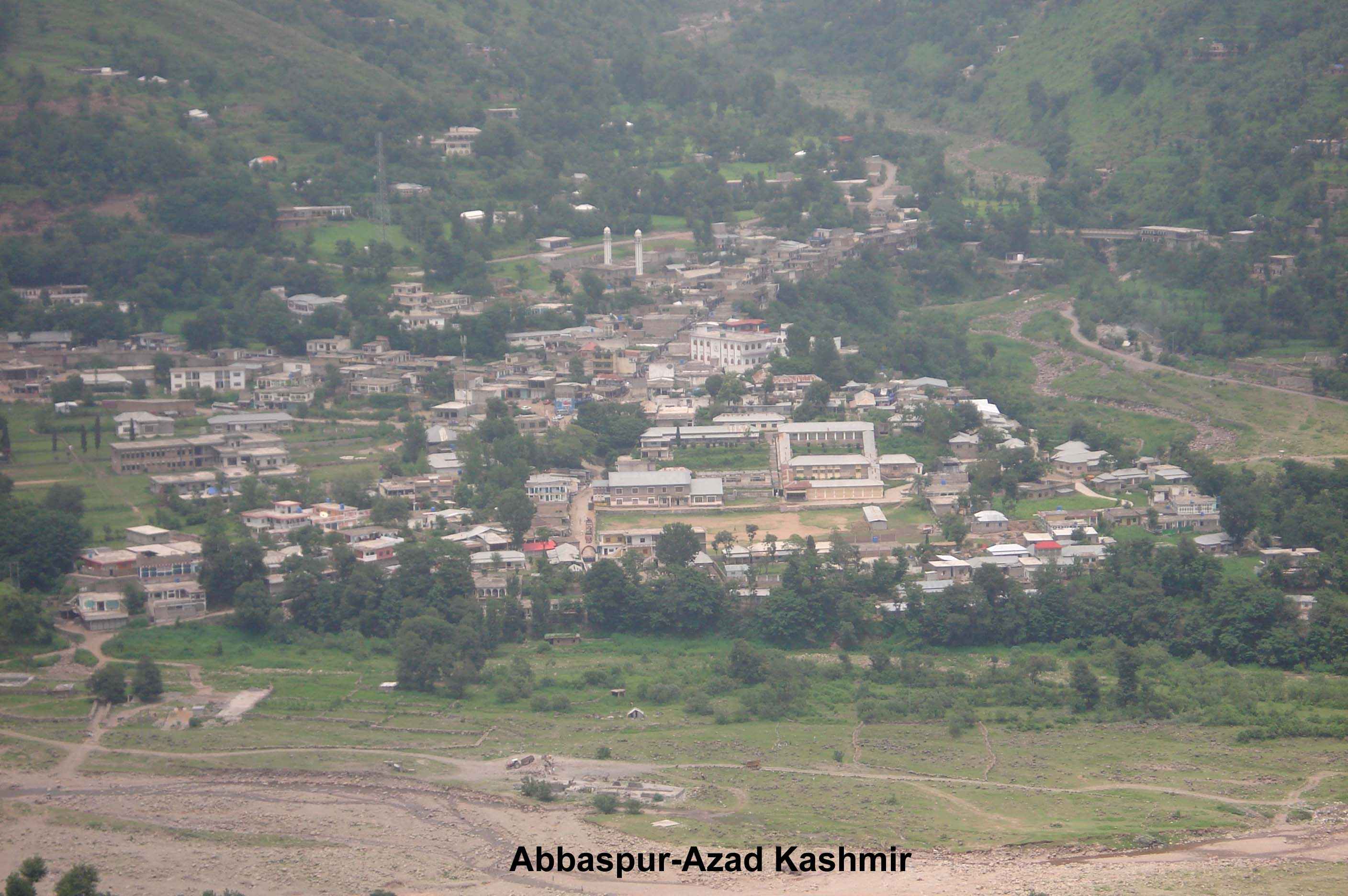
- Abbaspur in 2008

- Location within Azad Kashmir Location within Pakistan
- Coordinates: 33°48′50″N 73°58′40″E
- Administering country: Pakistan
- Territory: Azad Kashmir
- Division: Poonch
- District: Poonch

Area
  - Total: 136 km^{2} (53 sq mi)

Population (2017)
  - Total: 62,213
  - Density: 457/km^{2} (1,180/sq mi)
- Time zone: UTC+5 (PKT)

Abbaspur (Urdu: عباس پور) is a tehsil of Poonch District in Azad Kashmir, a part of Kashmir administered by Pakistan. It is located along the Line of Control between Pakistan and India and has been shelled by Indian forces as a consequence of the Kashmir conflict. As of the 2017 Pakistani census, the population of Abbaspur was 62,213.

== History ==
Indian shelling killed 6 people and wounded 20 others in Abbaspur in the first two weeks of July 2017. About 3,000 residents also fled the tehsil due to the violence, which was part of wider border skirmishes that year between Pakistan and India along the Line of Control.

Indian forces again shelled Abbaspur on 8 February 2020, from 3 pm until midnight. The shells hit civilian areas, killing Mir Muhammad, a 65-year-old retired Pakistani soldier, and wounding four others. Raja Farooq Haider Khan, the then prime minister of Azad Kashmir, condemned the attacks.

On 29 April 2023, two Pakistani civilians accidentally crossed the Line of Control from Abbaspur into Indian-controlled territory while watering their cattle. Indian authorities detained the pair before contacting Pakistani authorities and repatriating them the day after.

== Administration and geography ==
Abbaspur is a tehsil (subdistrict) of Poonch District in Azad Kashmir, a part of Kashmir administered by Pakistan. It covers an area of 136 square kilometres and is located along the Line of Control. The local government of Abbaspur has jurisdiction over 18 villages within its borders.

== Demographics ==
The 2017 Pakistani census recorded 62,213 people living in 10,660 households in Abbaspur.

== Notable people ==
Abdul Qayyum Khan Niazi, the 13th prime minister of Azad Kashmir, was born to the Dulli family in the village of Darra Sher Khan, in the Battal sector of Abbaspur. Niazi is not Abdul Qayyum's family name but a pseudonym he adopted in the 1990s as a Poonch district council member to avoid confusion with then Azad Kashmiri prime minister Muhammad Abdul Qayyum Khan.
