= Bagh District =

District in Azad Kashmir, Pakistan

Bagh District ضلع باغ
- District of Azad Kashmir administered by Pakistan
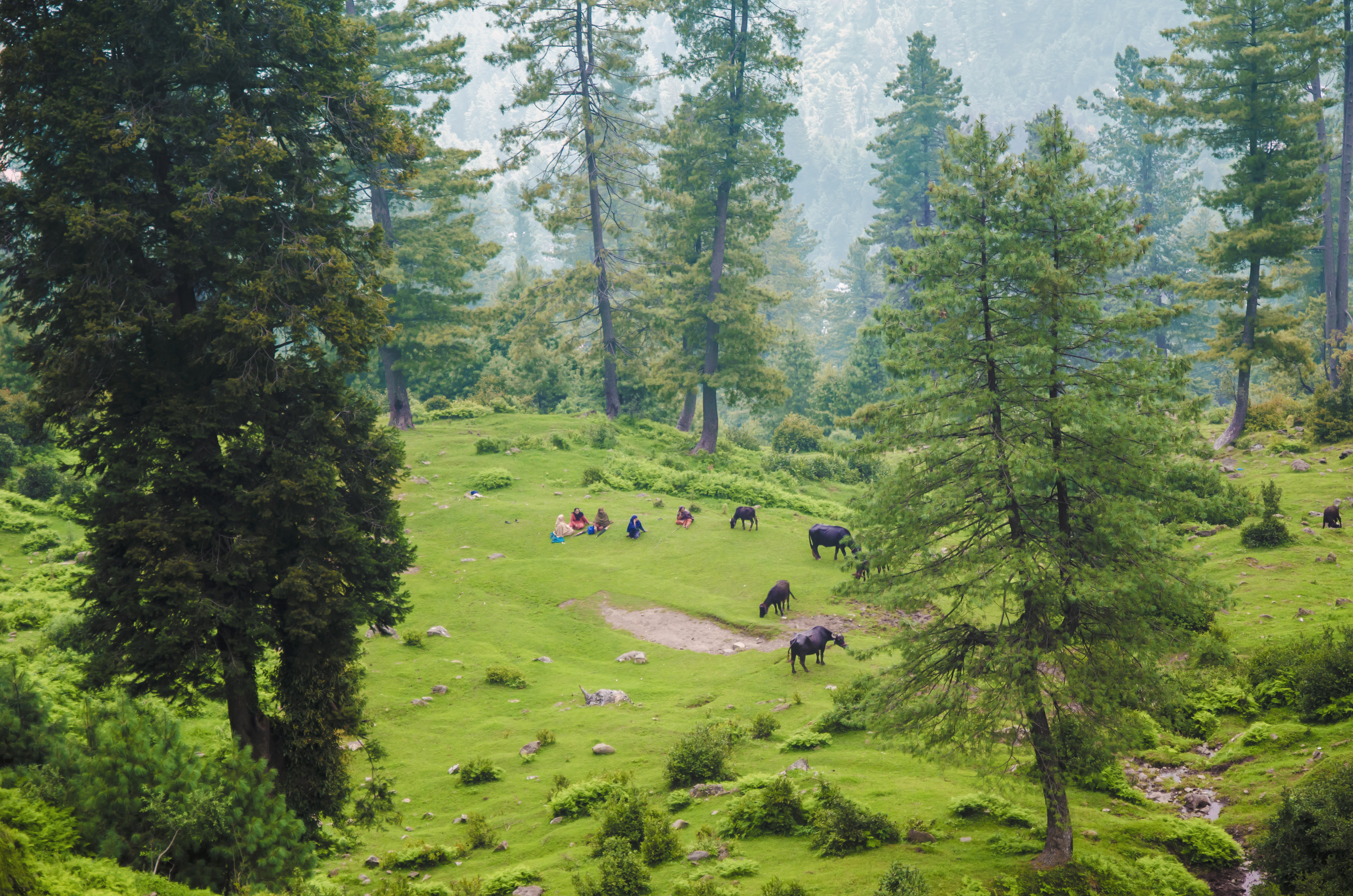

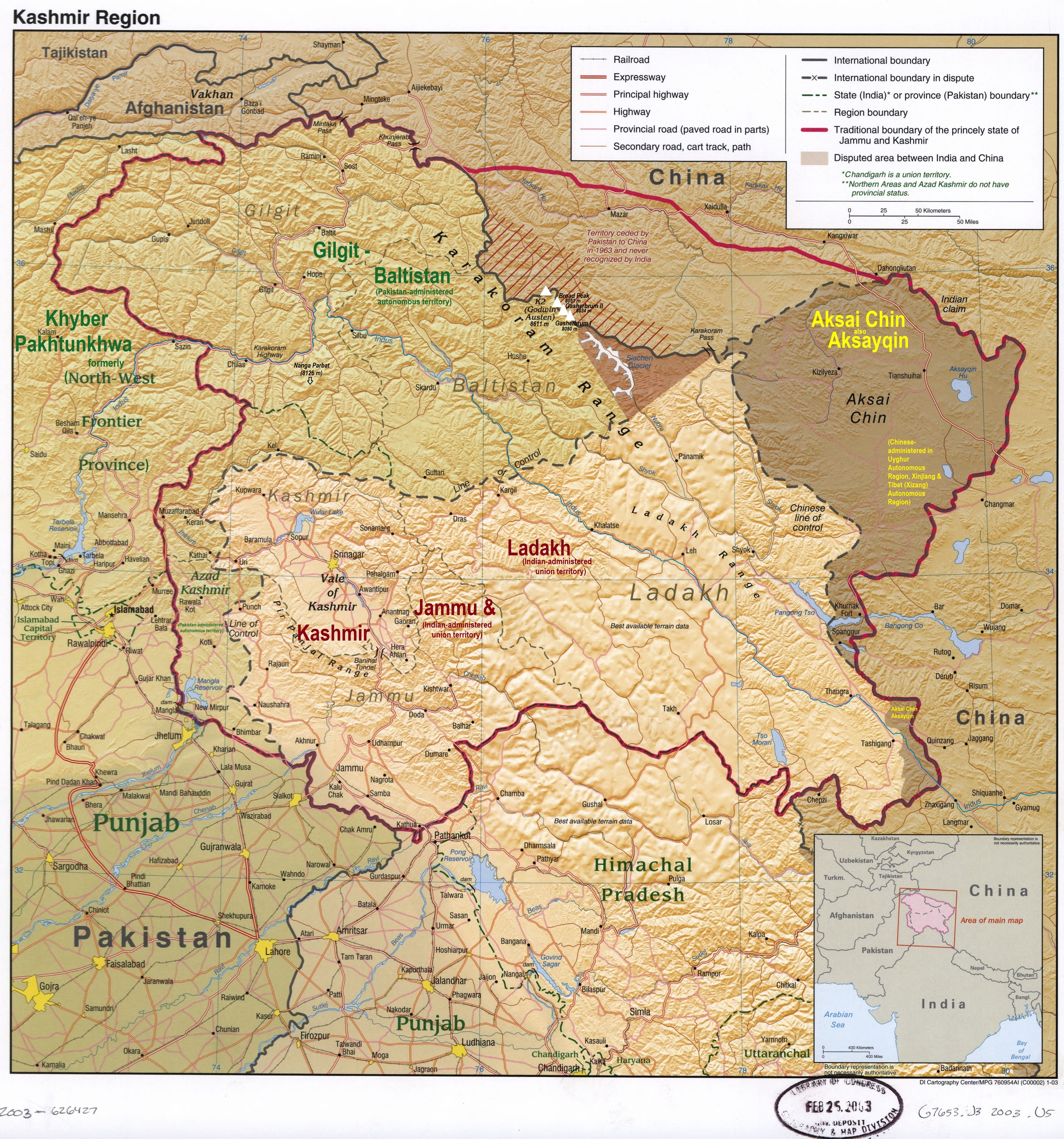
- A map showing Pakistani-administered Azad Kashmir (shaded in sage green) in the disputed Kashmir region
- Interactive map of Bagh District
- Coordinates (Bagh, Azad Kashmir): 33.9735°N 73.7918°E
- Administering country: Pakistan
- Territory: Azad Kashmir
- Division: Poonch Division
- Headquarters: Bagh

Government
  - Type: District Administration
  - Deputy Commissioner: N/A
  - District Police Officer: N/A
  - District Health Officer: N/A

Area
  - Total: 770 km^{2} (300 sq mi)

Population (2017)
  - Total: 371,919
  - Density: 483/km^{2} (1,250/sq mi)

Languages
  - Official: Urdu
  - Spoken: Pahari, Gujari, Kashmiri
- Number of Tehsils: 3

Bagh District (Urdu: ضلع باغ) is a district of Pakistan-administered Azad Kashmir in the disputed Kashmir region. It is one of the ten districts of Azad Jammu and Kashmir. Previously part of Poonch District, Bagh was established as a separate district in 1988.

The Bagh District is bounded on the north by the Muzaffarabad District, the Hattian Bala District, and the Baramulla District of Indian-administered Jammu and Kashmir, on the east by the Haveli District, on the south by the Poonch District, and on the west by the Abbottabad District of Pakistan's Khyber Pakhtunkhwa province and the Rawalpindi District of Pakistan's Punjab Province. The total area of the district is 770 square kilometers. The Bagh District is linked to the Muzaffarabad District by two roads, one via Sudhan Gali (80 km) and the other via Kohala (97 km). The district headquarters is the city of Bagh, which is situated 46 km from Rawalakot.

Map of Azad Kashmir with the Bagh District highlighted in red

== Demographics ==
The total population of the district according to the 2017 census is 371,919.

=== Social groups ===
Pahari, Gujjar and Kashmir are three main social groups of the district. Pahari make up 95%, Gujjar 3%, and Kashmir 2% in district's total population.

=== Language ===
Dhundi-Khairali variety of Pahari language is mainly spoken by 95% the district's population. Gujari spoken by 3% and Kashmiri by 2% of the district's total population.

1. Pahari (Dhundi-Khairali) (95.0%)
2. Gujari (Gojri) (3.00%)
3. Kashmiri (2.00%)

The main language of the district is Pahari, which is estimated to be native to around 95% of the inhabitants. The Pahari dialect spoken in Bagh is closely related to the dialect spoken to the north in the Muzaffarabad (84% shared basic vocabulary) and to the core Pahari varieties spoken to the south-west in the Galyat region around Murree (86–88%).

== History ==
It is said that a bagh (garden) was set up by a landowner where the premises of the Forest Department are now located. As a result, the area that is now the district headquarters was named "Bagh".

=== 2005 earthquake ===
The city of Bagh, like other areas of the district, was heavily damaged in the 2005 Kashmir earthquake. Sixty percent of the buildings collapsed. Thousands of people died, and many more found themselves homeless. In the aftermath of the earthquake, NATO sent specialists to the district to help with clearing and reconstruction. There was a report that an entire village in the district had been wiped out. The United States government, through Pakistan, distributed vouchers to people in the district so that they could buy food and water.

== Geography ==
Topographically, the entire Bagh District is a mountainous area, generally sloping from north-east to south-west. The area is part of the Lesser Himalayas zone. The main mountain range in the district is the Pir Panjal Range.

The Haji-Pir Pass is situated at a height of 3421 meters above sea level. The general elevation is between 1500 and 2500 meters above sea level. The mountains are generally covered with coniferous forests. The main river in the district is the Mahl Nala, but numerous other rivulets also flow in the district.

== Administration ==
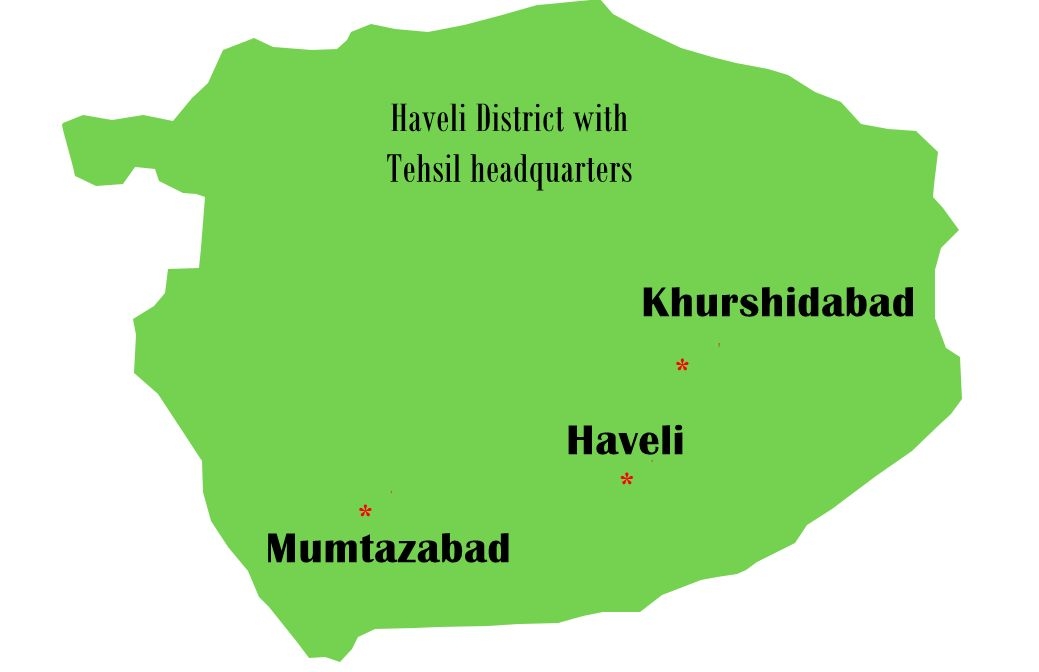
Map of Haveli District with tehsil headquarters highlighted

The Haveli District is divided into three tehsils:

- Haveli Tehsil
- Khurshidabad Tehsil
- Mumtazabad Tehsil

The district has 12 union councils consisting of 95 villages and one municipal corporation, Forward Kahuta.

=== Subdivisions ===
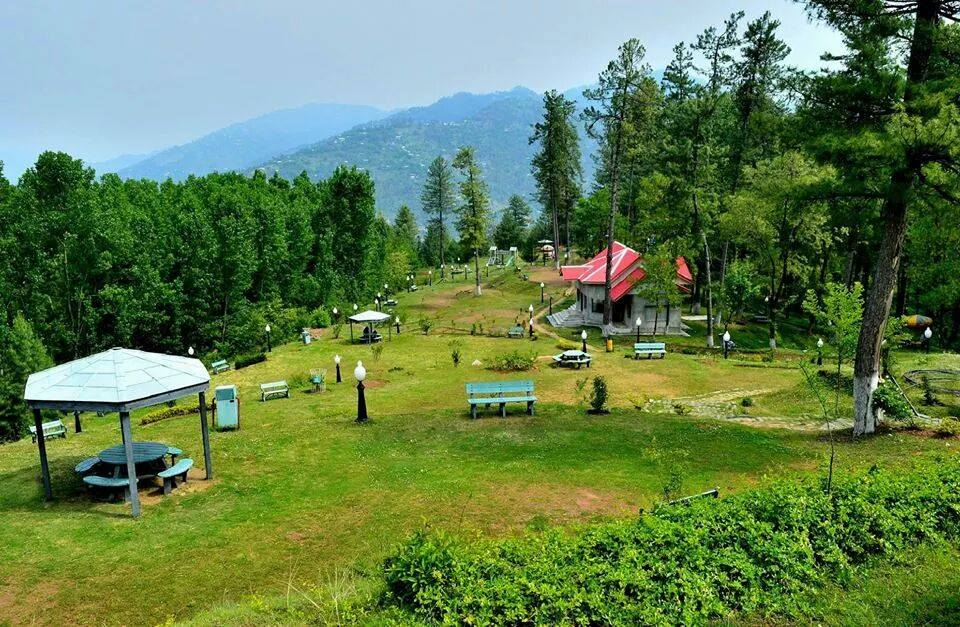
Dhirkot Park, Bagh District, Azad Kashmir

The district of Bagh is subdivided into 3 tehsils:

- Bagh Tehsil
- Dhirkot Tehsil
- Haveli Tehsil

== Climate ==
The climate of the district varies with altitude. The temperature generally remains between 2 °C and 40 °C. The main eastern part of the district is very cold in the winter and moderate in the summer. However, the lower valleys, the localities bordering Bagh at Kohala and its adjoining areas (Mongbajri and Ajra-Bagh) remain cold in the winter and hot in the summer. May, June, and July are the hottest months. The maximum and minimum temperatures during the month of June are about 40 °C and 22 °C, respectively. December, January, and February are the coldest months. The maximum temperature in January is about 16 °C, and the minimum temperature is -3 °C. At peaks such as Ganga Choti and Lasdana the temperature can reach as low as -10°C Annual rainfall is about 1,500 millimetres (59 in).

== Education ==
According to the Pakistan District Education Ranking 2017, a report by Alif Ailaan, the Bagh District is ranked at number 5 nationally in the ranking related to education, with an education score of 73.99. The learning score is at 85.42, with a gender parity score of 88.32.

The school infrastructure score of the Bagh District is 28.32, giving Bagh a national rank of 126. School infrastructure is a major problem in all of Azad Kashmir. Access to schools, with schools being far away, is the primary reason why there are fewer enrollments after the completion of primary school.
