= Poonch District, Pakistan =

District in Azad Kashmir, Pakistan

Poonch District ضلع پونچھ
- District of Azad Kashmir administered by Pakistan
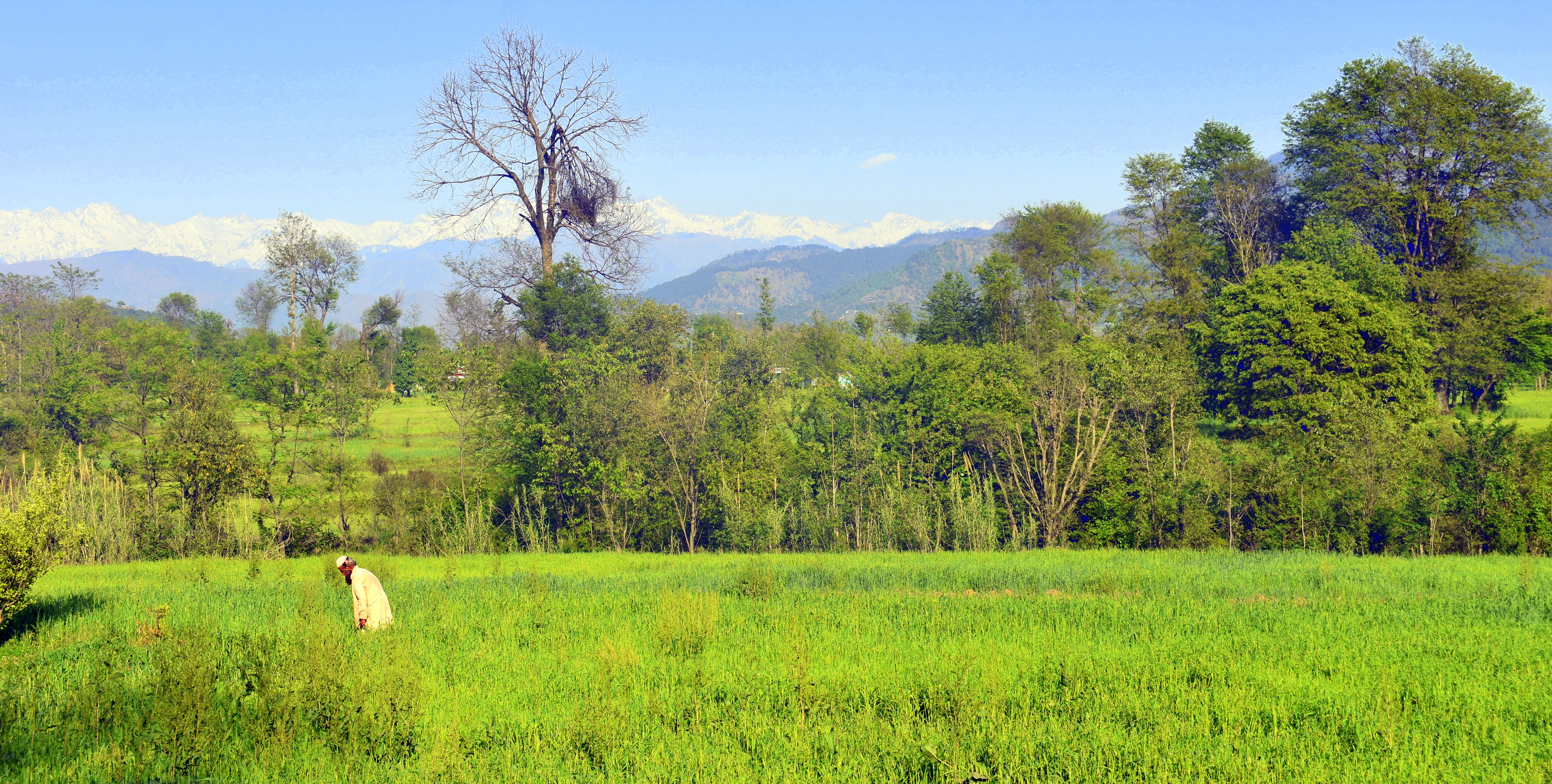
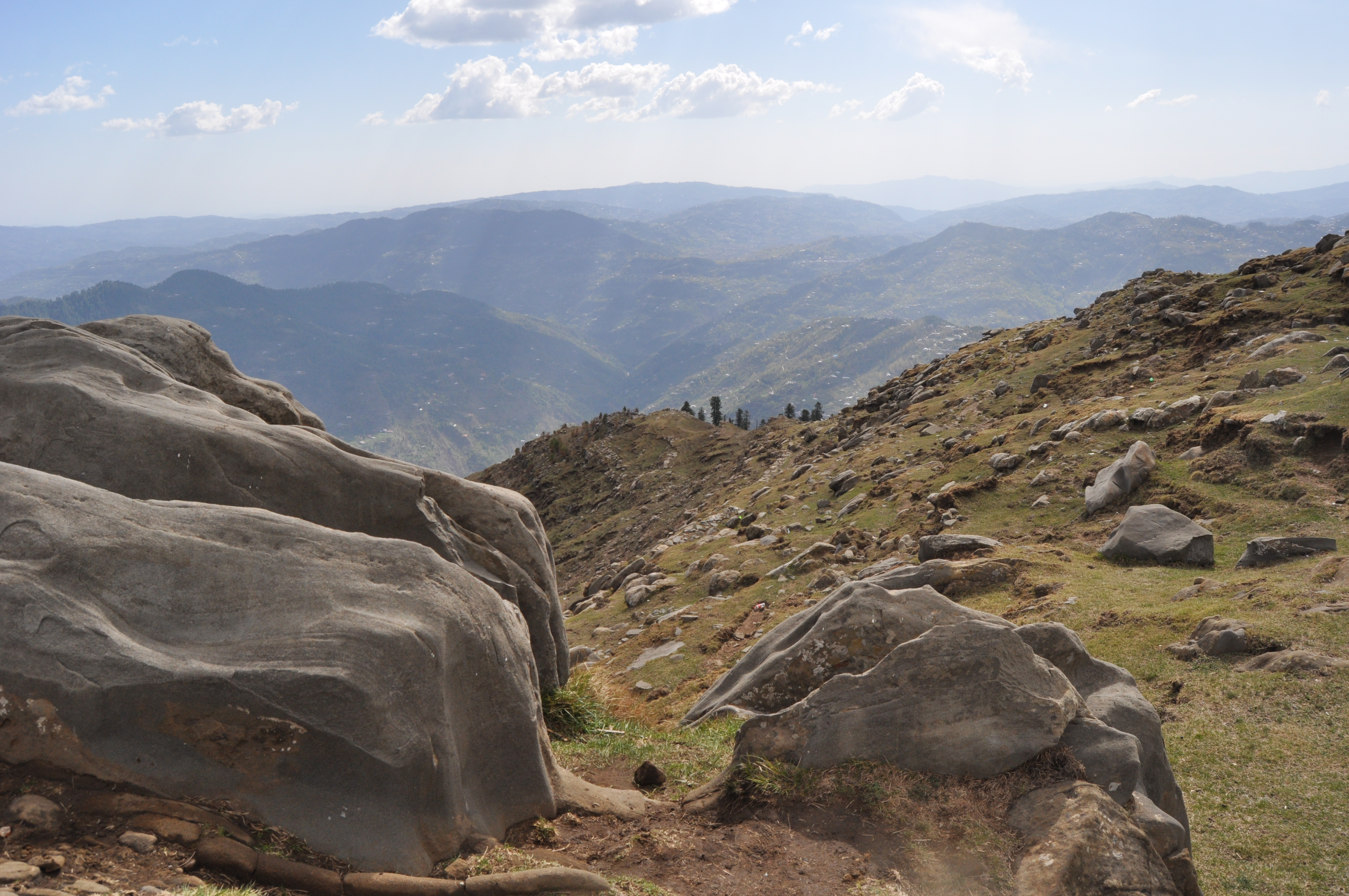
- top: Poonch Valley bottom:Tolipir
- Interactive map of Poonch district
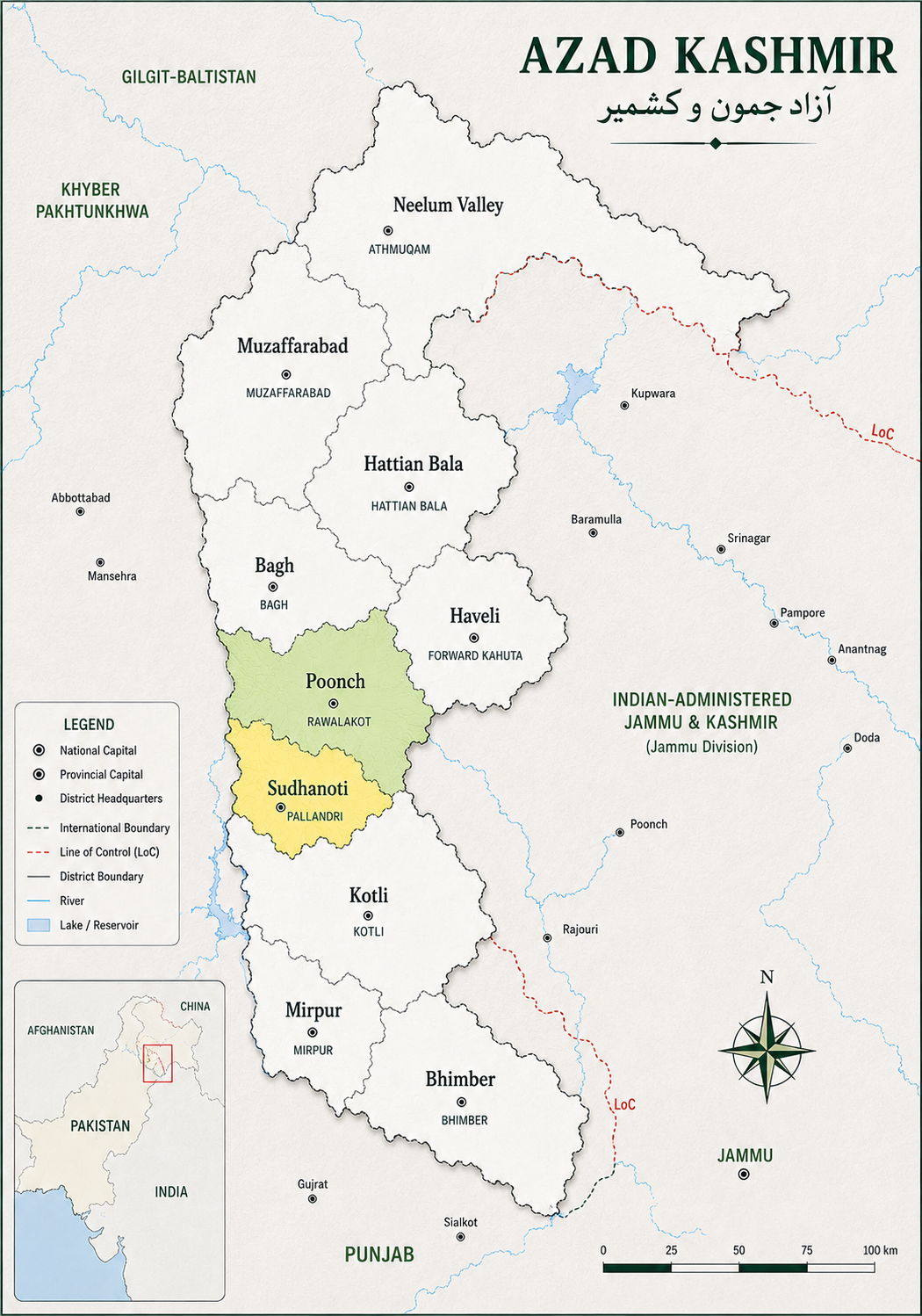
- A map showing Poonch district shaded in green along with Sudhanoti district in yellow
- Coordinates (Rawalakot): 33°51′12″N 73°45′5″E
- Administering country: Pakistan
- Territory: Azad Kashmir
- Division: Poonch
- Headquarters: Rawalakot

Government
  - Type: District Administration
  - Deputy Commissioner: N/A
  - District Police Officer: N/A
  - District Health Officer: N/A

Area
  - Total: 855 km^{2} (330 sq mi)

Population (2017)
  - Total: 500,571

Languages
  - Official: Urdu
  - Spoken: Pahari, Gujari
- Number of Tehsils: 4

Poonch District (Urdu: ضلع پونچھ) is one of the ten districts of the Pakistan-administered territory of Azad Kashmir in the disputed Kashmir region.

It falls in the Poonch Division and is bounded on the north by Bagh District, on the northeast by Haveli District, on the southeast by the Poonch District of the Indian-administered territory of Jammu and Kashmir, on the south by Sudhanoti and Kotli districts, and on the west by the Rawalpindi District of Punjab, Pakistan.

The Poonch District is part of the greater Kashmir dispute between India and Pakistan. The district headquarters is the city of Rawalakot. It is the third most populous district of Azad Kashmir. Historically, the area now constituting Poonch District was part of the Sudhanoti region, which later became a tehsil of the former Poonch State.

Map of Azad Kashmir with the Poonch District highlighted in red

== History ==
=== Karkota Dynasty (625–855) ===
Under the Karkota Dynasty, Poonch was firmly integrated into the Kashmiri Empire as a vital provincial territory and military staging ground. The dynasty's most powerful ruler, Lalitaditya Muktapida (r. 724–761 CE), is credited with the formal development of the town. The name Parnotsa originated during Lalitaditya's expeditions; it is said he took a "leaf" (parna) during a ritual there, marking the area as a permanent station for his central administration. The Karkotas utilized the Poonch-Rajouri routes to launch their famous campaigns into Punjab and the Salt Range. By controlling the mountain passes of Poonch, the Karkotas ensured that no power from the Indian plains could surprise the Valley.

=== Utpala and Lohara Dynasties (855–1339) ===
Poonch continued to remain as a dependency during the Utpala Dynasty. During the last years of the Dynasty, Queen Didda, who had Lohara origin, consolidated power laying the framework for the future established of the Lohara Dynasty. When Queen Didda's nephew, Sangramaraja—the son of the Lohara chief—ascended the throne, the dependency of Poonch effectively became the ruling house of all Kashmir establishing the Lohara Dyansty. During the early years of the Lohara Dynasty, the Kingdom was invaded by the Ghaznavids in 1015 and again in 1021 but the Ghaznavids were defeated soundly both the times. The dynasty was relatively weaker and was plagued by the Kashmiri Damaras(powerful feudal landlords) who were highly influential and often had more power than the Kings. In its last years, the Dynasty was severely weakened by the Mongol Invasion causing instability in the Kingdom and providing a power vacuum which would later on result in the establishment of Muslim Rule in Kashmir.

=== Kashmir Sultanate (1354–1596) ===
With the end of Hindu rule in Kashmir, Poonch came under the influence of the Shah Mir Dynasty. Sultan Shihab-ud-Din often likened to a medieval Lalitaditya, re-established Kashmiri dominance over the "intermediate hill-tracts" including Poonch. Shihab-ud-Din used the Poonch-Rajouri routes as a base for his military campaigns into the Punjab and Kabul. Shihab'ud-Din's reign was followed by a relatively weaker line of succession resulting in weakened hold over Poonch.

Kashmiri rule was reestablished during late 15th century through the military campaigns of Malik Tazi Bhat, a general of the Sultanate. He led military campaigns that resulted in the conquest and administration of several regions, including Poonch, Jammu, Rajouri, Bhimber, Jhelum, Sialkot, and Gujrat, from 1475 to 1487. Following its incorporation, Poonch was administered as a vassal state under the Kashmir Sultanate. Local rulers retained a degree of autonomy but were required to acknowledge the suzerainty of the Sultan and provide tribute and military support when necessary. This arrangement persisted until the late 16th century, when the region came under Mughal influence. In 1596, Mughal Emperor Jahangir granted Siraj-ud-Din Rathore rulership over Poonch, marking the end of its vassalage under Kashmir.

=== Mughal Era (1596–1752) ===
In 1596, Mughal Emperor Jahangir granted Siraj-ud-Din Rathore rulership over Poonch Jagir. Earlier, during his second visit to Kashmir in 1592, Emperor Akbar, accompanied by Prince Salim (later Jahangir), had passed through the Haji Pir Pass, where Rathore's hospitality had greatly impressed them. As a result, the Mughals rewarded him with authority in the region. Siraj-Ud-Din and his descendants ruled the some parts of Poonch area up to 1792. The Rathore family and their descendants ruled substantial parts of Poonch until around 1792, administering their domains as separate jagirs under Mughal suzerainty. However, their authority did not extend over the entire territory and areas such as Sudhanoti and nearby highlands were governed by local Sudhan chieftains, who likewise maintained their own independent jagirs. Thus, the political structure of Poonch during this period was fragmented, with Rathore rulers and Sudhan chiefs each exercising autonomous control over their respective estates.

=== Durrani Empire (1752–1819) ===
Under the leadership of Ahmad Shah Abdali, the Durrani Afghans conquered Kashmir, taking advantage of the declining Mughal Empire. They thus obtained control of Poonch, and established their government in the region. They ruled the region until 1819, when the Sikh Empire routed them from the Kashmir Valley, and annexed parts of Poonch (eastern half). They subsequently lost rule in any remaining territories in Kashmir.

=== Tribal Coalitions (1819–1832) ===
In the western parts of Poonch (modern day Poonch Division, AJK) the local tribes had entrenched themselves in the hills. The Muslim tribes of the region formed a defensive coalition against the Sikhs, at the head of which was the Sudhan tribe.

After Gulab Singh received the chakla of Jammu as a jagir (autonomous territory), he made renewed attempts at conquering Poonch, but the armies he raised were not large enough to defeat the resistance, and consequently he would face defeats before being forced to withdraw.

In 1832, Gulab Singh convinced Ranjit Singh to attack the coalition. Ranjit marched with an army of 60,000 troops alongside an assortment of hill cannons. The coalition made the decision to surrender, accepting the suzerainty of the Sikhs over Poonch.

=== Sikh Empire (1819–1846) ===
The Sikhs had conquered the eastern part of Poonch in 1819, but did not exert full control over it until the tribal coalition was defeated in 1832.

In 1822, Ranjit Singh appointed Gulab Singh as the Raja of Jammu and, in 1827, appointed Dhyan Singh as the Raja of Bhimber, Chibbal and Poonch (covering the Mirpur and Poonch districts as of 1947). Dhyan Singh spent most of his time in Lahore, subsequently becoming the diwan (prime minister) in the Sikh court. Gulab Singh is said to have managed his jagirs on his behalf.

In 1837, the hill tribes of Poonch, led by the Sudhans launched a rebellion. They captured Sikh garrisons and defeated the son of Gulab Singh, Ottam Singh, whom had been sent with a force of five thousand troops to crush the rebellion. Though the rebels captured the majority of Poonch, after Gulab Singh returned from his campaign against the Yusufzai, he was able to incite treachery within the rebellion. Gulab Singh then attacked with an army of twenty-thousand which he had raised in Kahuta, and after fierce fighting and aid of Sikh reinforcements, he captured key forts of the rebels and their leaders, flaying alive Sudhan sardars Malli Khan and Sabz Ali Khan, executions of other commanders and notables from the rebellious tribes and killed the main leader of the rebellion, Shams Khan. Gulab Singh's forces caused devastation and massacres within captured rebel territory, due to which he faced controversy, particularly by the British, and obtained the reputation of a tyrant.

After the death of Ranjit Singh in 1839, the Sikh court fell into anarchy and palace intrigues took over. Dhyan Singh, Suchet Singh as well as Dhyan Singh's son Hira Singh were murdered in these struggles. Poonch was confiscated by the Sikh Durbar on the grounds that the Rajas had rebelled against the state and handed it over to Faiz Talib Khan of Rajouri.

=== Princely state of Jammu and Kashmir (1846–1947) ===
After the First Anglo-Sikh War (1845–1846) and the subsequent Treaties of Lahore and Amritsar, the entire territory between the Beas and the Indus rivers was transferred to Gulab Singh, including Poonch. He was recognised an independent ruler, a maharaja, of the newly created state of Jammu and Kashmir. Gulab Singh reinstated the jagir of Poonch to Jawahir Singh, the eldest remaining son of Dhyan Singh. Thus, the Dogra dynasty became the rulers of the state.

=== Separation of Poonch ===
Map of Azad Kashmir with the Poonch Division highlighted in red (The Poonch Divion was created from the Azad Kashmiri-administered portion of the pre-1947 Poonch District.)

After independence of India and Pakistan in 1947, there was a rebellion in the western part of the Poonch District. The rebels led by Sardar Ibrahim Khan, sought support from the Dominion of Pakistan, which provided arms and then launched an invasion of its own, using Pashtun tribals. In response, the Maharaja of Jammu and Kashmir joined India, and the conflict turned into an Indo-Pakistani war. When a ceasefire was effected, the then Poonch District was divided into two parts. The former headquarters, the city of Poonchin the eastern part, came under Indian control, and the western part of the district came under Pakistani control, a new capital was established at Rawalakot.

=== 1949 to Present ===
The Pakistan-administered portion of the Poonch district was reorganised as the Poonch Division. Of the four tehsils of the original Poonch District, viz., Bagh, Sudhnoti, Haveli, and Mendhar, the Poonch Division included the first two and a portion of the third. Those three tehsils were eventually made separate districts, and a new Poonch District was created in the center of the Poonch Division by incorporating portions of the Bagh and Sudhnoti tehsils.

Poonch district was the main area of violent anti government revolt (led by the Sudhan tribe) during the 1955 Poonch uprising, which lasted from early 1955 to late 1956.

== Demographics ==
According to the 2017 census, the district has a population of 152,124.

=== Social groups ===
Pahari and Gujjar are the two main social groups of the Poonch District. Paharis make up 94% and Gujjars make up around 6–7% of the district's population, with a population of 30,034. Other ethnic groups in the district are Kashmiri, Sayed, and Punjabis.

=== Language ===
Poonchi Pahari is the main language of Poonch district spoken by 94% of district's population. Second major, is Gujari spoken by 6–7% district's population of Gujjars. The English and Urdu has the status of the official language.

1. Pahari (Punchi) (94.0%)
2. Gujari (Gojri) (6.00%)

== Administrative divisions ==
The district is administratively subdivided into four tehsils:

- Abbaspur Tehsil
- Hajira Tehsil
- Rawalakot Tehsil
- Thorar Tehsil

== Towns ==
- Khai Gala
- Barmang

== Education ==
According to the Pakistan District Education Ranking 2017, a report released by Alif Ailaan, the Poonch District is ranked number 8 nationally, with an education score of 73.52. Over the past five years, the Poonch District has shown the most improvement in the establishment of middle schools. The learning score for the Poonch District is 84.15. The school infrastructure score for the Poonch District is 14.88, ranking the district at number 151, which places it among the bottom five districts in terms of infrastructure in Pakistan and its two dependent territories. Schools in the Poonch District also have severe problems with regard to electricity, drinking water and boundary walls, as reflected in their scores of 2.67, 12.1 and 6.23, respectively. The condition of some school buildings also presents a major safety risk for students.

== Transport ==
The Poonch-Rawalakot Bus, which crosses the LOC, has helped to re-establish ties across the border.

== See also ==
- History of Poonch District
- Poonch district, India
- 1947 Poonch Rebellion
- Poonch Medical College in Rawalakot

== Bibliography ==
- Snedden, Christopher (2013) [first published as The Untold Story of the People of Azad Kashmir, 2012], Kashmir: The Unwritten History, HarperCollins India, ISBN 978-9350298985
- Snedden, Christopher (2015), Understanding Kashmir and Kashmiris, Oxford University Press, ISBN 978-1-84904-342-7
