= Tourism in Punjab =

Tourism in Punjab may refer to:

- Tourism in Punjab, India
- Tourism in Punjab, Pakistan
