= Tourism in Balochistan, Pakistan =

Tourism in Balochistan is a developing industry, and is overseen by the Tourism Directorate under the Government of Balochistan. Balochistan is known for its long coastal belt which extends from Karachi through Sonmiani, Ormara, Kalmat, Pasni, Gwadar, Jiwani and all the way up to Iran. It is also popular for its hill tops and rugged mountainous terrain.

== History of Balochistan ==
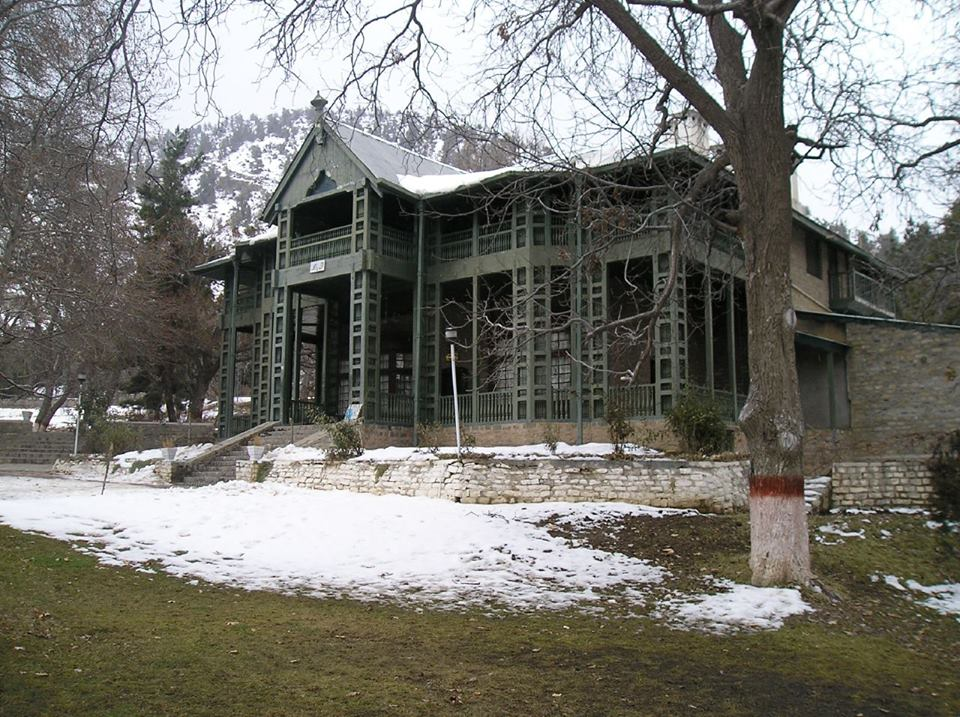
Quaid-e-Azam Residence, Ziarat

Balochistan is the largest province of Pakistan. Comprising 44% of the country's land mass. It traces its history from times immemorial when it was inhabited by Stone Age hunters. According to French Archaeologist Professor Jarrige, by 6,000 BC farmers on the Bolan River were cultivating barley, wheat and dates using floodwater and storing their surplus in large mud bins. The people here were growing cotton and making pottery. Before the birth of Christ, it had commerce and trade links with ancient civilization of Babylon through Iran and into the valleys of Tigris and Euphrates. Alexander the Great (326 BC) had an encounter with the Sibia tribe of Balochistan. Muhammad Bin Qasim (711 AD) and Mehmood Ghaznavi (11th century AD) also invaded Balochistan resulting in the development of Muslim character. Even today most tribal people of this province resemble Arabs and the inhabitants can be quite a fascinating subject of study by anthropologists.

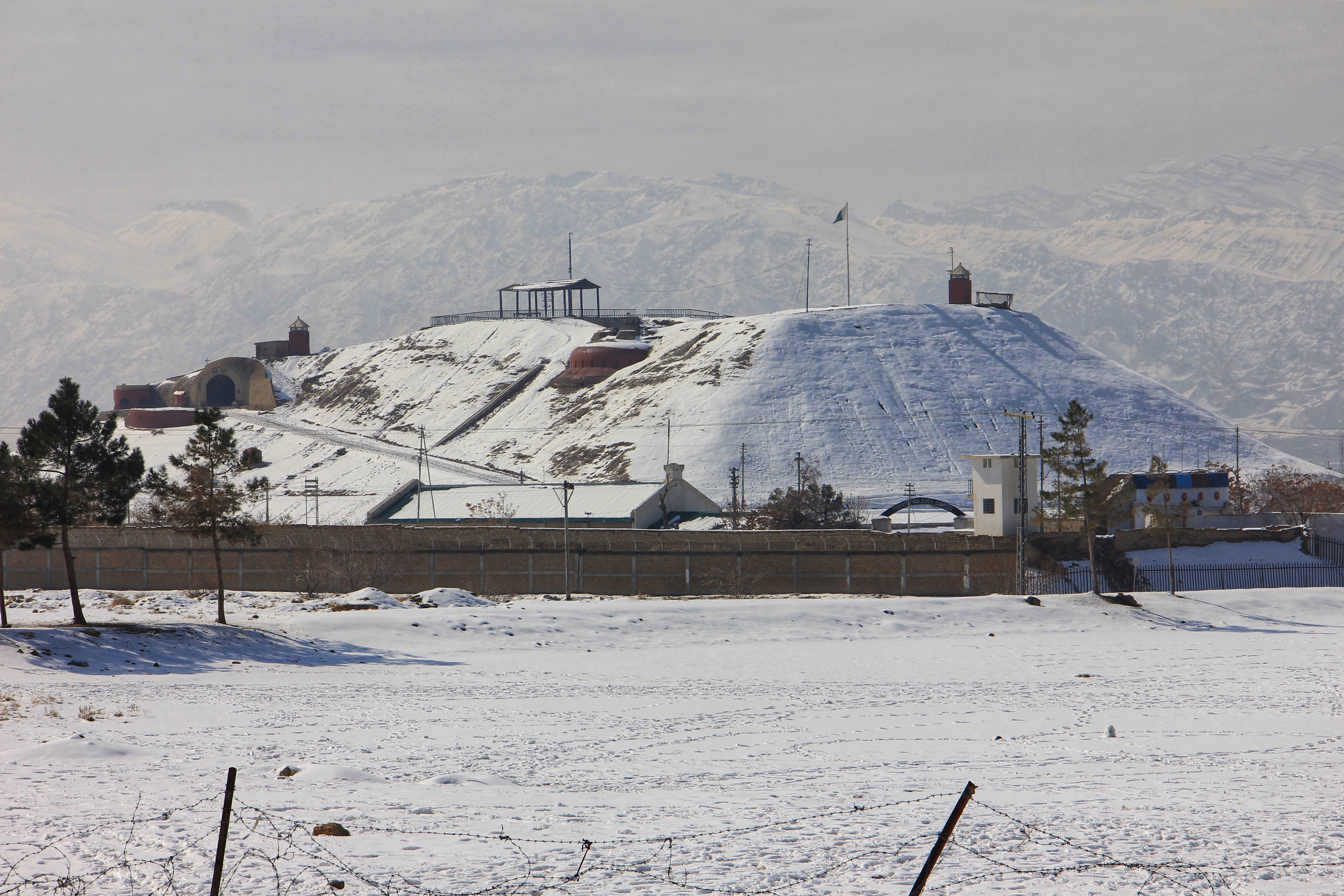
Quetta, Balochistan in winter

Quetta is the capital city of Balochistan and an important cultural centre in the region with its diverse landmarks; the port of city of Gwadar is a quickly developing town that aims to serve as a key hub of future industrial and shipping activity. The desert safari of Taftan, the ferry service of Gwadar, the parks and restaurants in Chaman and the hotels and open recreation spots in Jiwani, Pasni, Ormara, Ziarat and Zarghoon provide a diverse blend to the tourist experience in Balochistan.

== Climate of Balochistan ==
The climate of the upper highlands is characterized by very cold winters and warm summers. Winters of the lower highlands vary from extremely cold in the northern districts to mild conditions closer to the Makran coast. Summers are hot and dry. The arid zones of Chaghi and Kharan districts are extremely hot in summer. The plain areas are also very hot in summer with temperatures rising as high as 120 degrees F (50 degrees C). Winters are mild on the plains with the temperature, never falling below the freezing point. The desert climate is characterized by hot and very arid conditions. Occasionally strong windstorms make these areas very inhospitable.

=== Rainfall ===
Average annual precipitation in Balochistan varies from 2 to 20 inches (50 to 500 mm). Maximum precipitation falls in the northeastern areas with annual average rain fall ranging from 8 to 20 inches (200 to 500 mm). It decreases in the south and the eastern parts and is minimum in Naukundi. Kharan and Dalbandin area, rainfall ranges between 1 and 2 inches (25 to 50mm). Evaporation rates are higher than the precipitation and generally vary from 72 to 76 inches (1830 1930 mm) per annum.

=== Rivers and streams ===
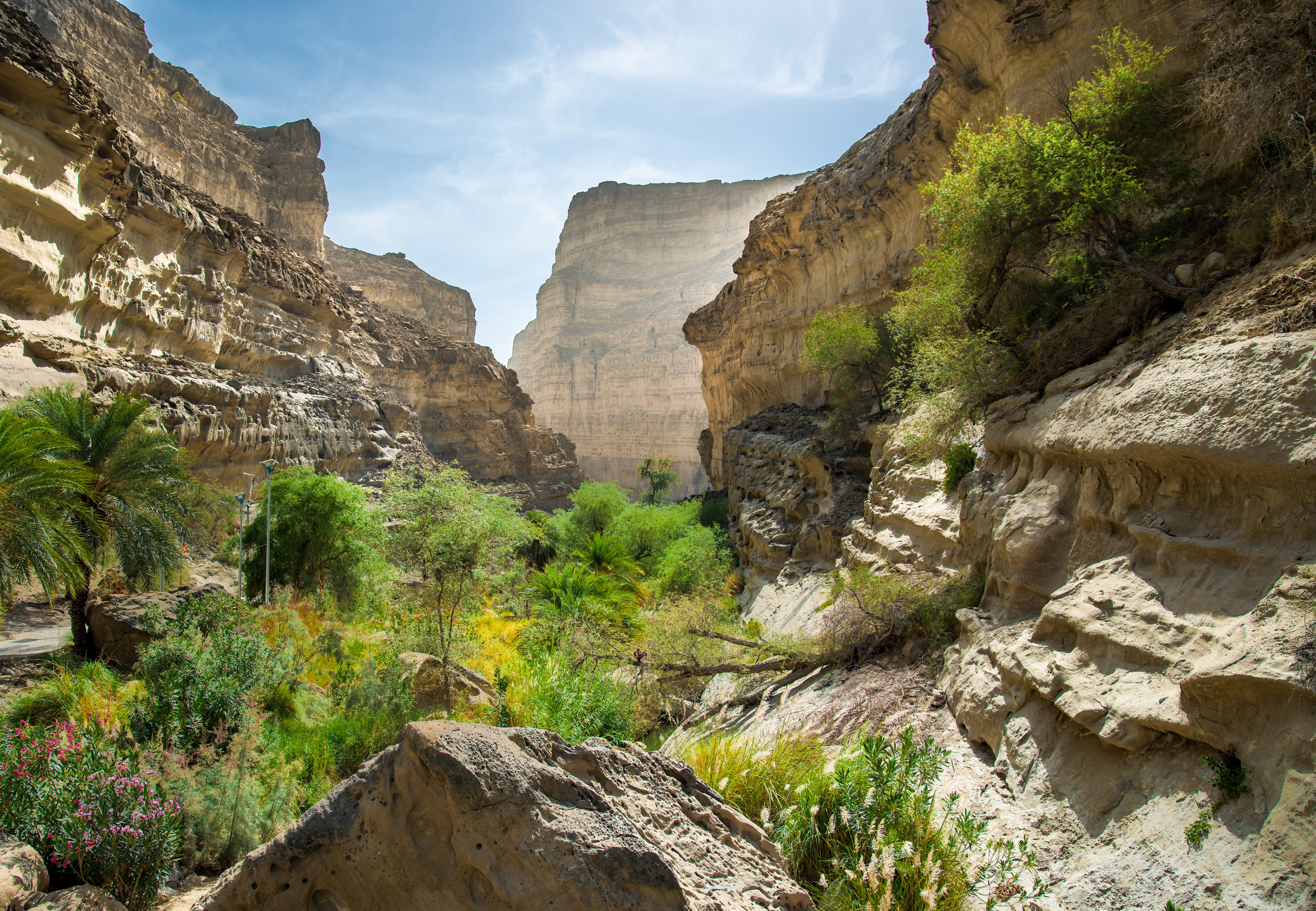
Canyons at the national park

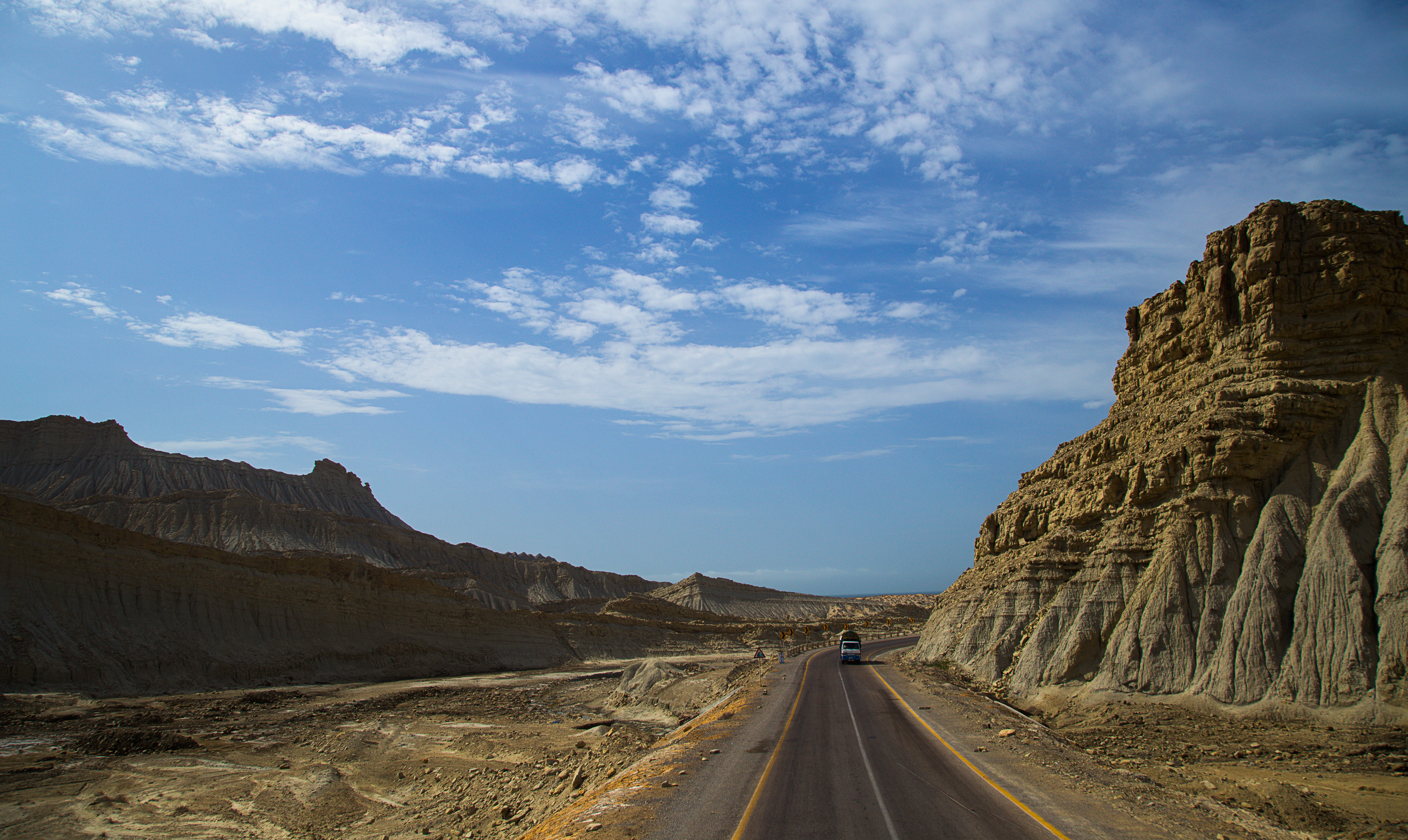
Makran Coastal Highway

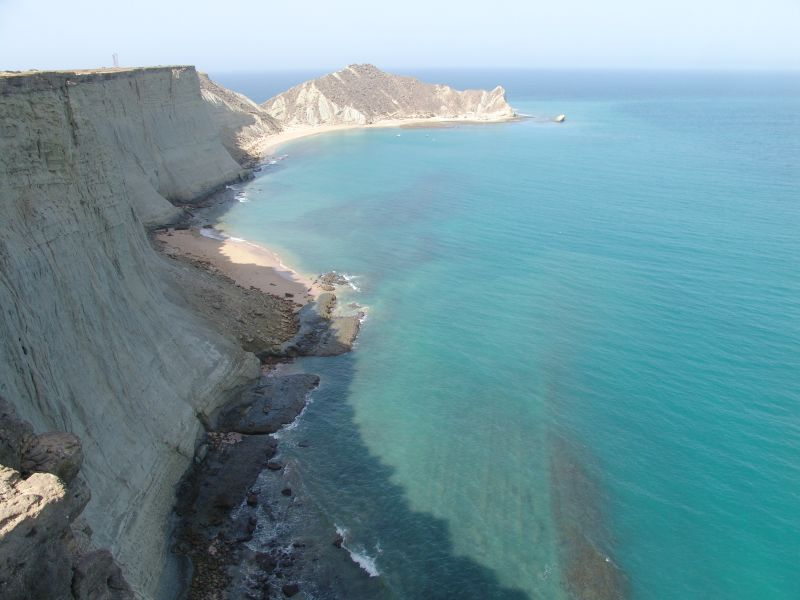
Astola Island

All rivers and streams are part of three major drainage systems. Coastal drainage system is characterized by small, ephemeral streams and hill torrents. Rivers and streams that do not possess any significant perennial flow constitute Inland system that dominates the central and northwestern area of the province. Nari, Kaha and Gaj rivers are part of Indus drainage system located in the northeastern margins of the province. The flow in rivers is typified by spring runoff and occasional flash floods. The rivers beds are dry and look like small streams. Stream gradients are high and the rate of run off is very rapid. The Zhob River Basin drains towards the northeast into the Gomal River which ultimately joins the Indus River. Streams along the border of Punjab and Sindh provinces flow toward the east and southeast into the Indus River. Central and western Balochistan drains towards the south and the southwest into the Arabian Sea. Some areas located in districts Chaghi, Kharan, and Panjgur drain into playa lakes, locally called " Hamun" such as Humun-e-Lora and Hamun-e-Mashkel etc.

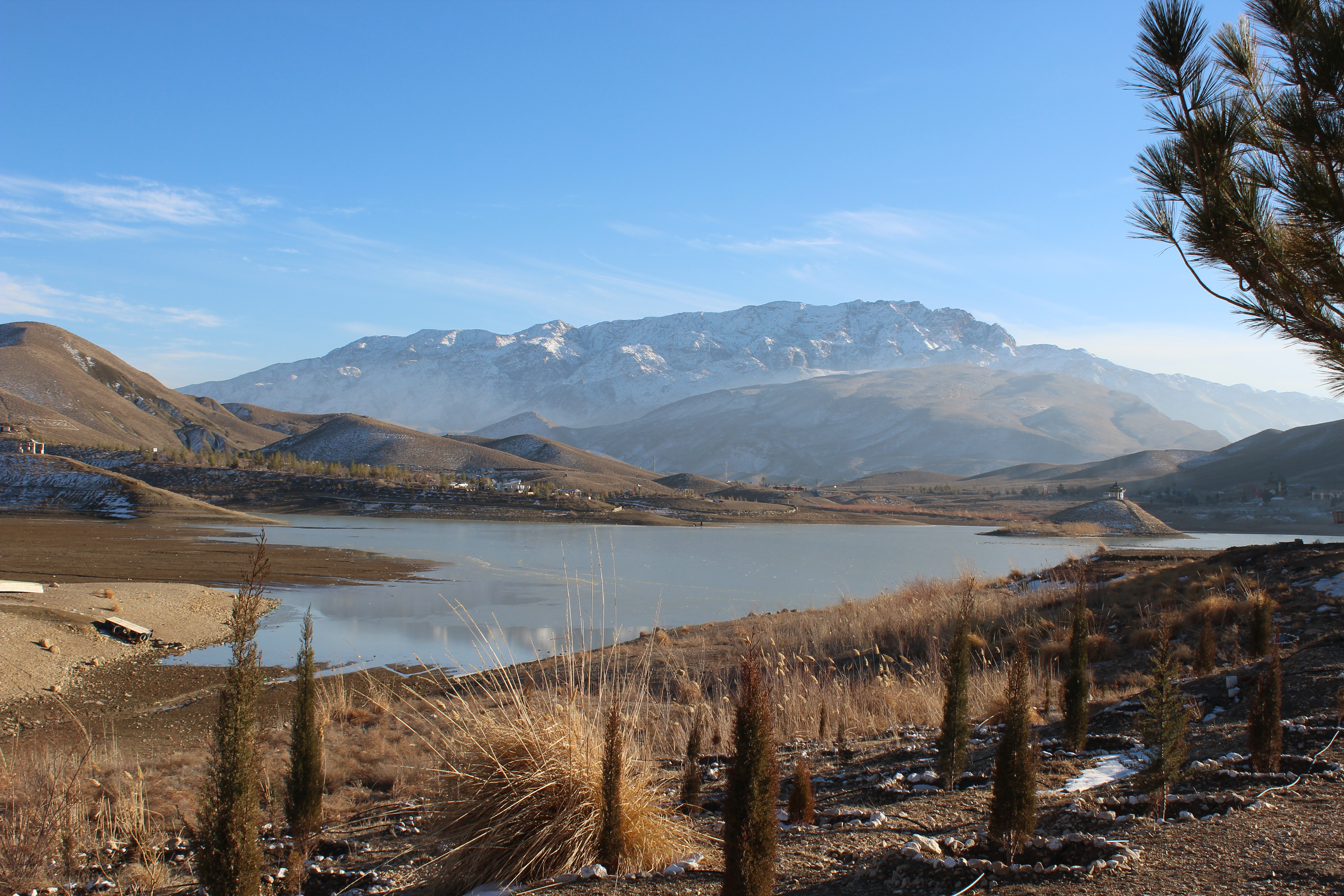
Hanna Lake, Quetta

The important rivers in Balochistan are Zhob, Nari, Bolan, Pishin, Mula, Hub, Porali, Hingol, Rakshan and Dasht.

== Culture and Heritage ==
=== People ===
A number of tribes constitute to make people of Balochistan. Three major tribes are Baloch (Baloch & Brahvi) and Pashtoon. The Balochi speaking tribes include Rind, Lashar, Marri, Jamot, Ahmedzai, Bugti Domki, Magsi, Kenazai, Khosa, Rakhashani, Dashti, Umrani, Nosherwani, Gichki, Buledi, Notazai, Sanjarani, Meerwani, Zahrozai, langove, kenazai and Khidai. Each tribe is further sub-divided into various branches. The tribal chief is called Sardar while head of sub-tribe is known as Malik, Takari or Mir. Sardars and Maliks are members of district and other local Jirgas according to their status. The Baloch, believed to have originally come from Arabia or Asia minor, can be divided into two branches: the Sulemani and Mekrani as distinct from the Brahvis who mostly concentrate in central Balochistan. Among the eighteen major Baloch tribes, Bugtis and Marris are the principal ones who are settled in the buttresses of the Sulemania. The Talpur of Sind also claim their Baloch origin.

=== Festivals ===
There are religious and social festivals celebrated by the people of Balochistan. Major religious festivals of Muslims are Eid-ul-Azha and Eid-ul-Fiter. On these festivals people adorn their houses, wear new dresses, cook special dishes and visit each other. Eid-Meladun-Nabi is another religious festival. It is a celebration of the Holy Prophet’s birthday. Numerous colorful social festivals are also source of jubilation. Sibi festival that traces its roots to Mehergar, an archeological site of ancient human civilization, attracts people from across the country. It is attended by common folks, ministers and other government officials. Folk music performance, cultural dances, handicrafts stalls, cattle shows and a number of other amusing activities present a perfect riot of color. Buzkashi is a peculiar festival showing valour of Balochistan people. It is celebrated on horse-back by two teams that use their skills to snatch a goat from the each other.

== Places of interest ==
- Astola Island
- ((Spin karaiz lake))
- ((wali tangi dam))
- ((karkhsa park Quetta

))

- Bolan Pass
- ((Zardalo))
- ((sandeman tangi))
- ((pir ghaib))
- Makran Coastal Highway
- Gwadar
- Hanna Lake
- Hingol National Park
- Hazarganji-Chiltan National Park
- Jiwani Coastal Wetland
- Juniperus macropoda
- Khuzdar
- Lahoot Lamakan
- Kund Malir
- Quetta
- Mehrgarh
- Moola Chotok
- Urak Valley
- Ziarat
- Ziarat Juniper Forest
- Hinglaj Mata Temples

== See also ==
- Tourism in Pakistan
  - Tourism in Punjab, Pakistan
  - Tourism in Sindh
  - Tourism in Khyber Pakhtunkhwa
  - Tourism in Azad Kashmir
  - Tourism in Gilgit-Baltistan
  - Tourism in Karachi
