= Tourism in Azad Kashmir =

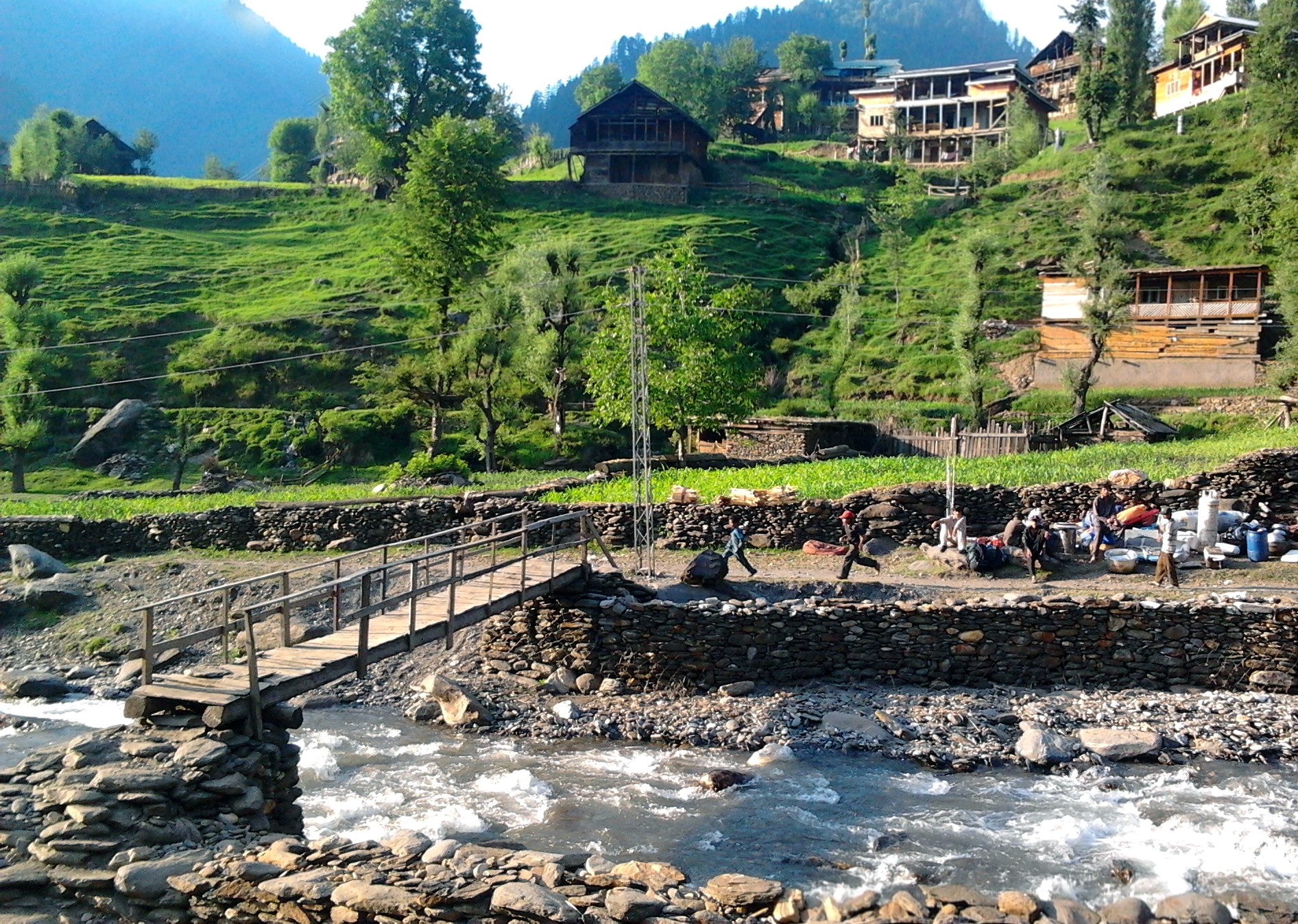
Neelum Valley is a popular tourist destination in Azad Kashmir

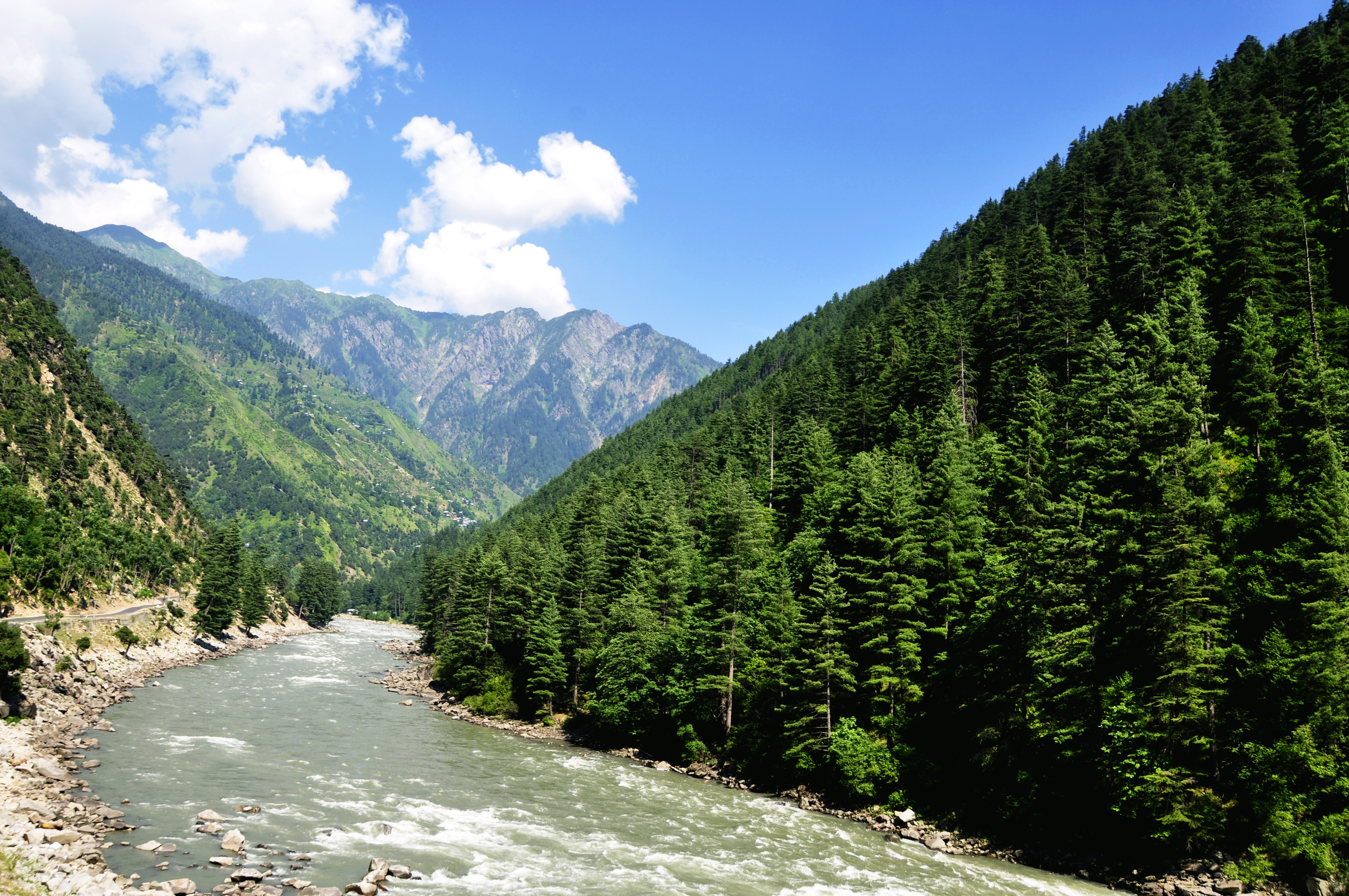
Verdant forests predominate in the Neelam Valley

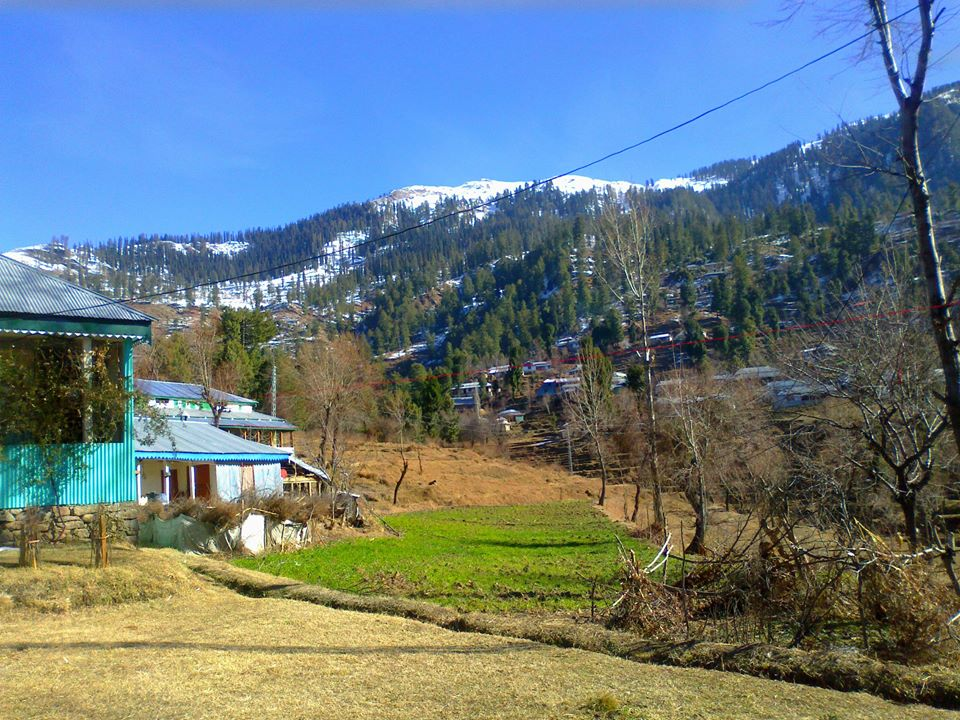
Kotla in Bagh District

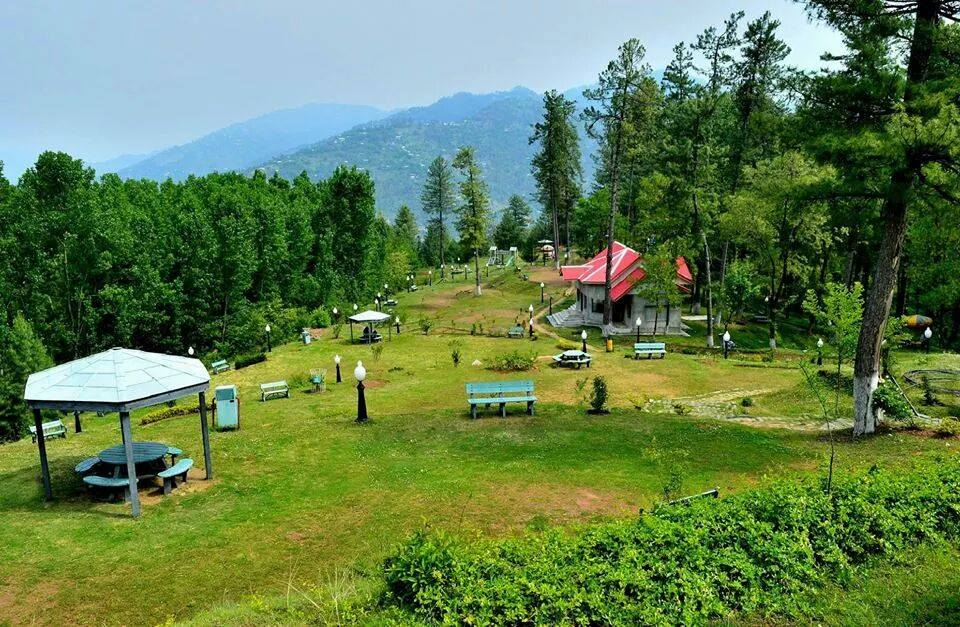
Dhirkot Park, Bagh District

The northern part of Azad Jammu and Kashmir encompasses the lower part of the Himalayas, including Jamgarh Peak 4,734 m (15,531 ft) . However, Sarwali peak in the Neelum Valley is the highest peak in the state. Fertile, green, mountainous valleys are characteristic of Azad Kashmir's geography and it is considered one of the most beautiful regions on the subcontinent.

The southern parts of Azad Kashmir including Bhimber, Mirpur and Kotli districts has extremely hot weather in summers and moderate cold weather in winters. It receives rains mostly in monsoon weather.

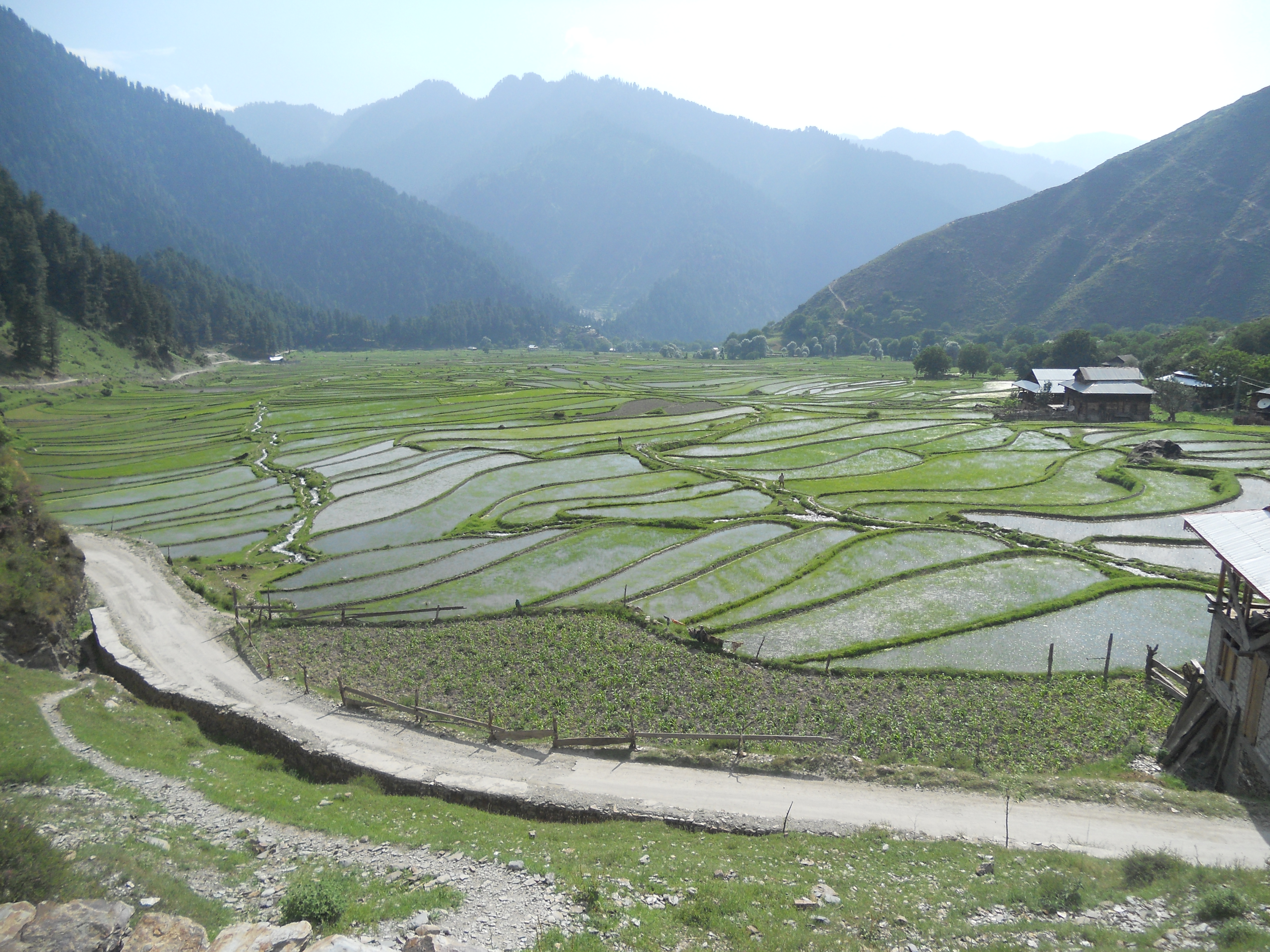
Paddy field in Leepa Valley

In the central and northern parts of state weather remains moderate hot in summers and very cold and chilly in winter. Snow fall also occurs there in December and January.

This region receives rainfall in both winters and summers. Muzaffarabad and Pattan are among the wettest areas of the state. Throughout most of the region, the average rainfall exceeds 1400 mm, with the highest average rainfall occurring near Muzaffarabad (around 1800 mm). During summer, monsoon floods of the Jhelum and Leepa river are common, due to high rainfall and melting snow.

== Main places ==
- Ganga Choti
- Neelum Valley
- Sharda
- Arang Kel

=== Valleys ===
- Bandala Valley
- Jhelum Valley
- Kas Chanatar
- Leepa Valley
- Neelum Valley
- Samahni Valley
- Bagh Valley
- Gulmarg

=== Lakes ===
- Chitta Katha Lake
- Baghsar Lake
- Chhota Gala Lake
- Ganga Lake
- Ratti Gali Lake
- Saral Lake
- Shounter Lake
- Subri Lake

=== Rivers ===
- Jhelum River
- Neelum River
- Poonch River
- Shingo River

== See also ==
- Tourism in Pakistan
  - Tourism in Punjab, Pakistan
  - Tourism in Balochistan
  - Tourism in Khyber Pakhtunkhwa
  - Tourism in Gilgit-Baltistan
  - Tourism in Sindh
  - Tourism in Karachi
