= Tourism in Sindh =

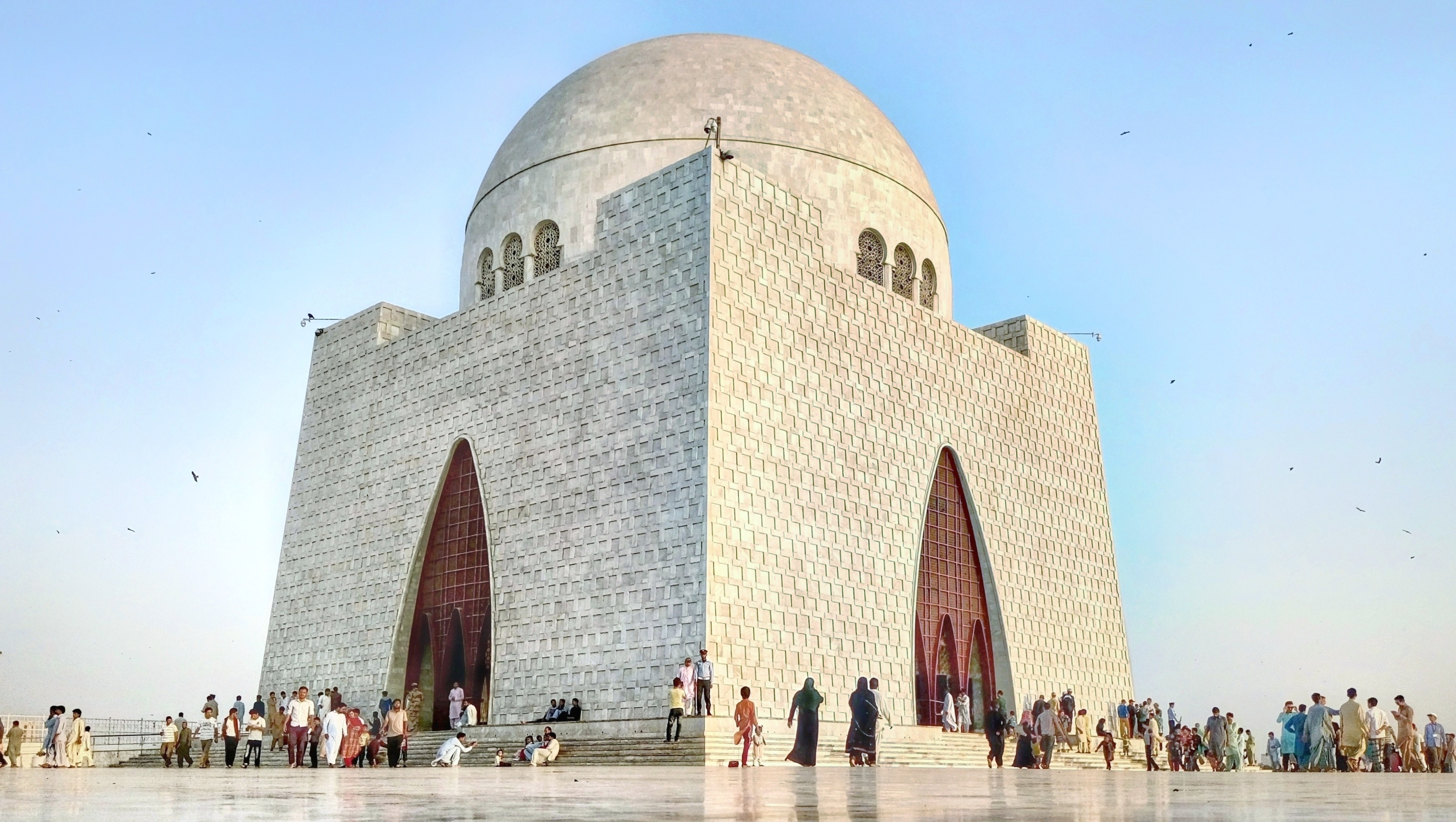
Mazar-e-Quaid in Karachi

Sindh is a province in Pakistan.

The province includes a number of important historical sites. The Indus Valley civilization (IVC) was a Bronze Age civilization (mature period 2600–1900 BC) which was centred mostly in the Sindh. Sindh has numerous tourist sites with the most prominent being the ruins of Mohenjo-daro near the city of Larkana. Islamic architecture is quite prominent as well as colonial and post-partition sites. Natural sites, like Manchar Lake have increasingly been a source of sustainable tourism in the province.

== Significant sites ==
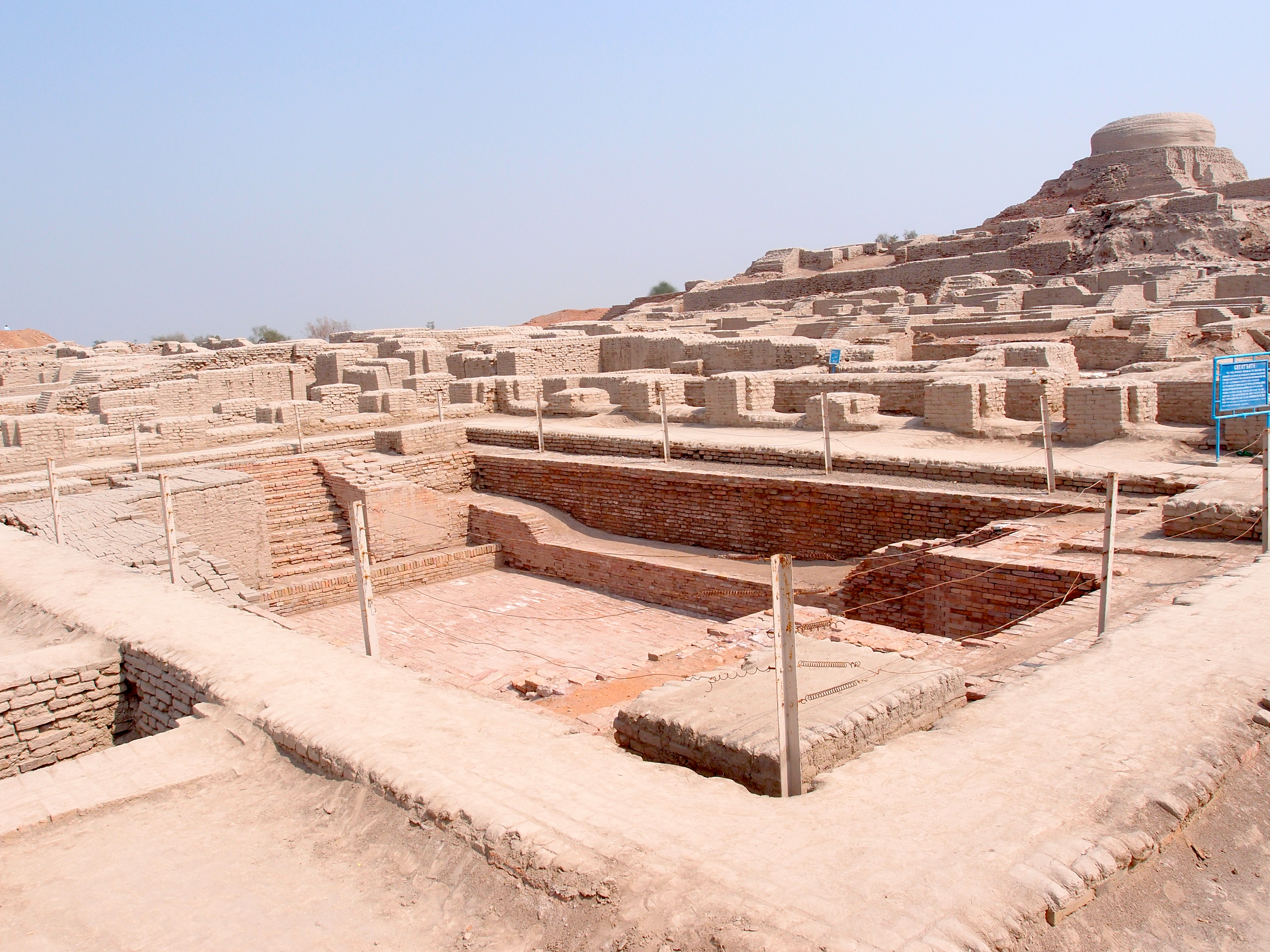
Archaeological ruins at Mohenjo-daro, Larkana

Sindh has numerous tourist sites with the most prominent being the ruins of Mohenjo-daro near the city of Larkana. Islamic architecture is quite prominent in the province with the Shahjahan Mosque in Thatta built by the Mughal emperor Shahjahan and numerous mausoleums dot the province including the very old Shahbaz Qalander mausoleum dedicated to the Iranian-born Sufi and the beautiful mausoleum of Muhammad Ali Jinnah known as the Mazar-e-Quaid in Karachi.

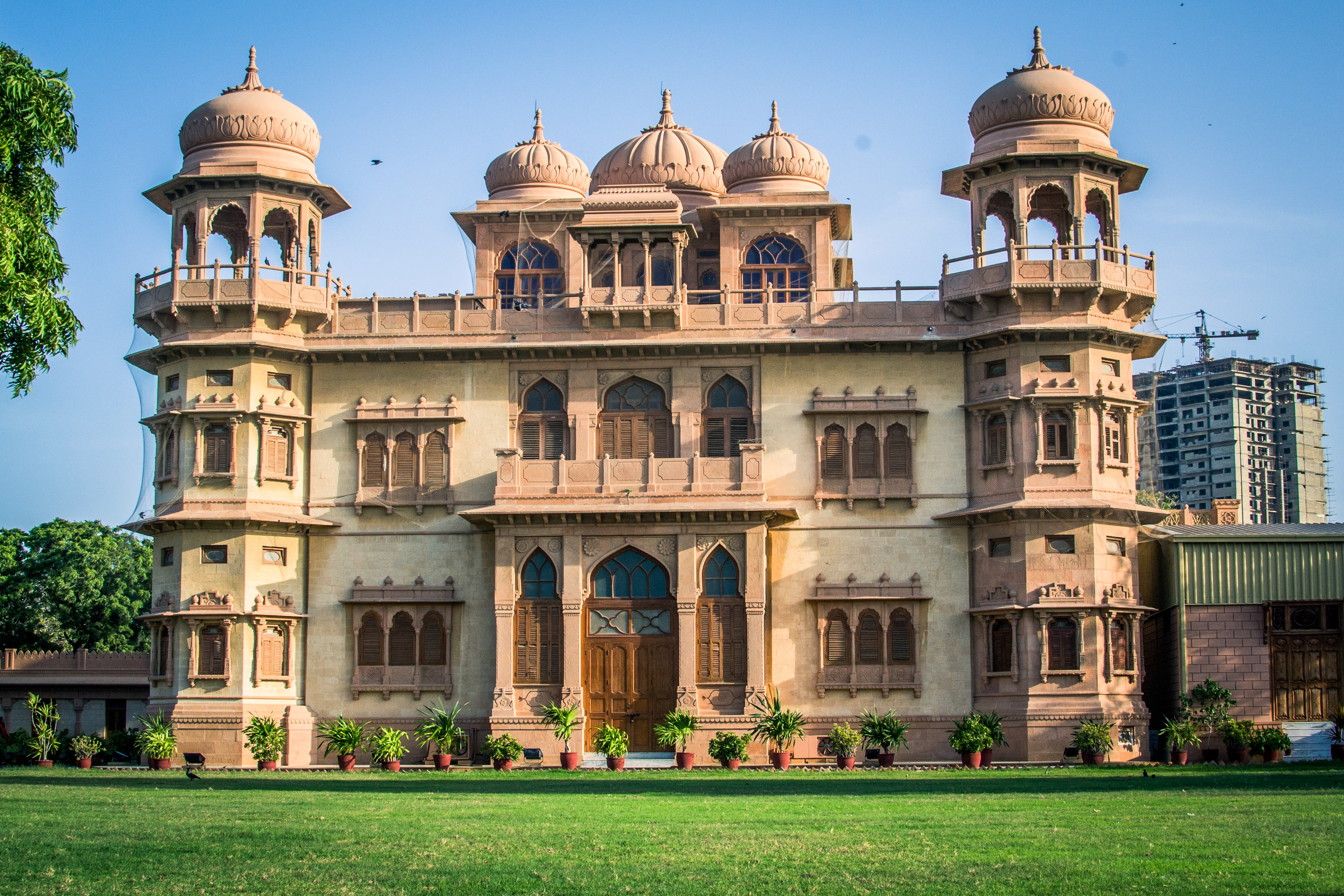
Mohatta Palace in Karachi

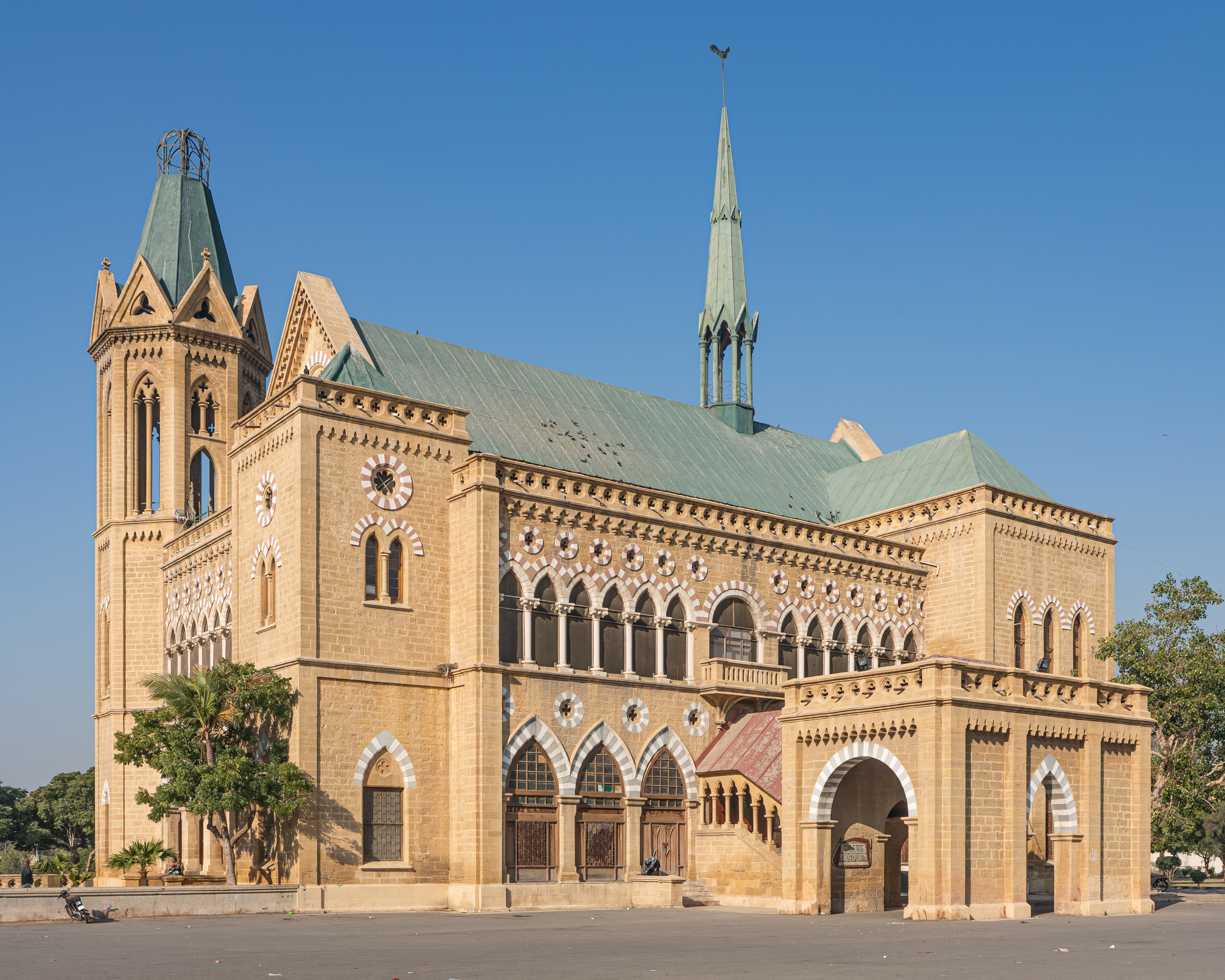
Frere Hall in Karachi

Mohatta Palace, a museum in Karachi built in 1927 by Shivratan Chandraratan Mohatta a Hindu Marwari businessman. At Partition of Sub-continent in 1947, Mohatta Palace was acquired by the newly established Government of Pakistan to house its Ministry of Foreign Affairs. Frere Hall is one of the finest architecture of the British Colonial Era which is one of the most significant tourists spot in Karachi. The hall was built by Sir Henry Bartle Frere, started in 1863 and finished in 1865. Faiz Mahal is also a palace situated in Khairpur, Sindh. It was built in 1798 by Mir Sohrab Khan who belongs to Talpur family.

== Eco-tourism ==
Manchar Lake is the largest freshwater natural lake in Pakistan, lies 18 kilometres (11 mi) west of Sehwan on the Indus Highway. It is claimed to be one of the biggest freshwater lakes in Pakistan and the only lake that is home to fishermen living on wooden boathouses for hundreds of years. The lake spreads over an area of 233 kilometres (145 mi)^{2} and gets its water from the Kirthar Hills torrents and Indus River. The lake receives 385,000 visitors a year.

== Other places of interest ==
=== Historical sites ===
- Chaukhandi tombs
- Empress Market
- Faiz Mahal
- Frere Hall
- Jehangir Kothari Parade
- Kot Diji Fort
- Mazar-e-Quaid
- Mohenjo-daro
- Makli Necropolis
- Mohatta Palace
- Qasim Fort
- Ranikot Fort
- Umerkot Fort

=== Hilly areas ===
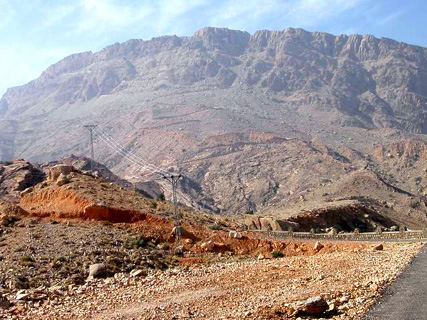
Khanwal Pass

- Kirthar Mountains
- Karoonjhar Mountains
- Gorakh Hill

=== Lakes ===
- Manchar Lake
- Keenjhar Lake
- Haleji Lake
- Drigh Lake

== Government support ==
=== Development corporation ===
Sindh Tourism Development Corporation (STDC) (Sindhi: سنڌ ٽوئرزم ڊولپمينٽ ڪارپوريشن) is an organization of the Government of Sindh, Pakistan. STDC is governed by the Board of directors and provides facilities to the national and international tourists. It runs several motels and resorts across the Sindh province. STDC was incorporated on 5 June 1992.

The corporation was formed to develop and promote tourism in Sindh, using its geographical assets, its ancient history, its Sufi heritage, its archaeology, its creative and performing arts, and its literature.

== See also ==
- Tourism in Pakistan
  - Tourism in Punjab, Pakistan
  - Tourism in Balochistan
  - Tourism in Khyber Pakhtunkhwa
  - Tourism in Azad Kashmir
  - Tourism in Gilgit-Baltistan
  - Tourism in Karachi
