= Tourism in Khyber Pakhtunkhwa =

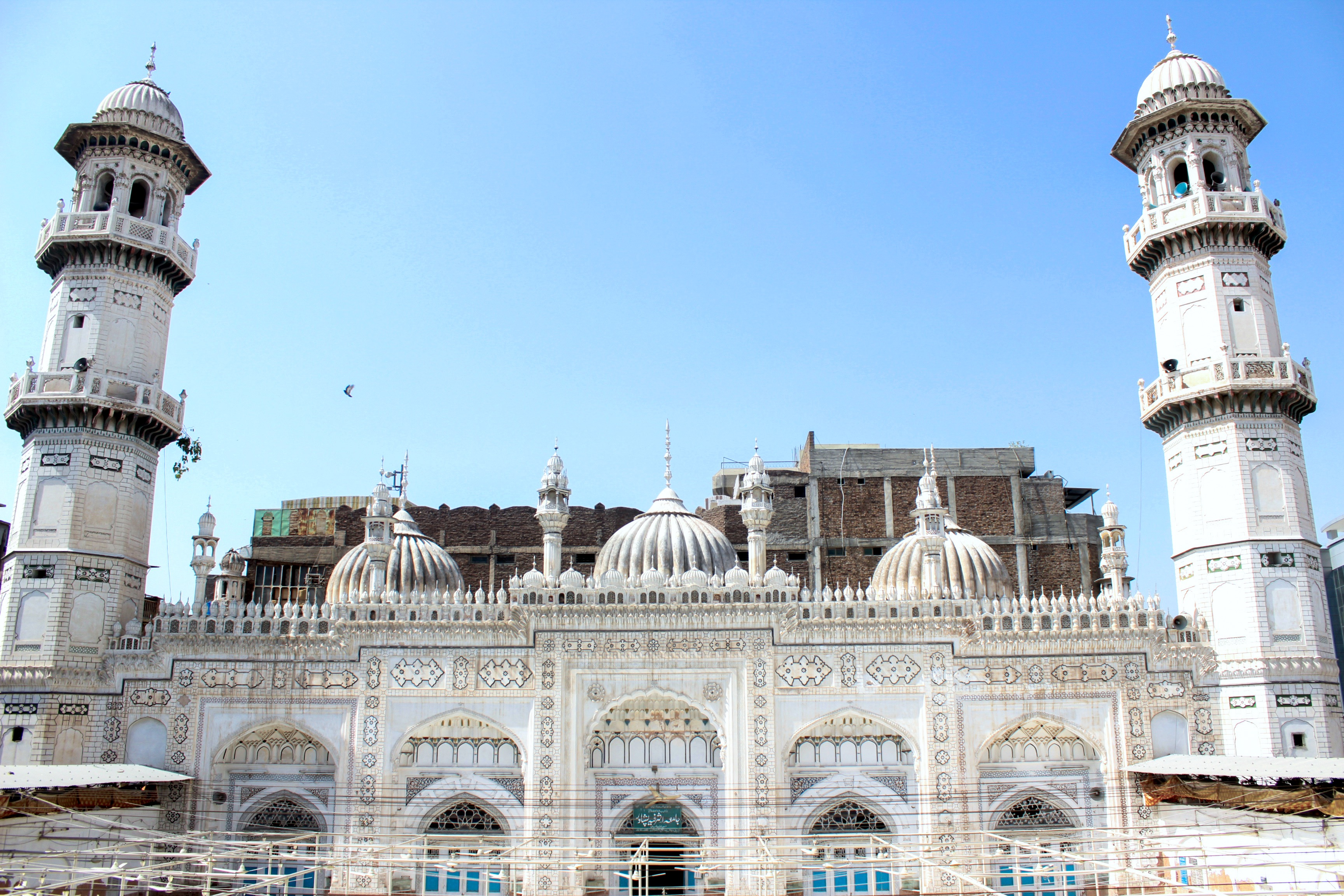
Mahabat Khan Mosque in Peshawar

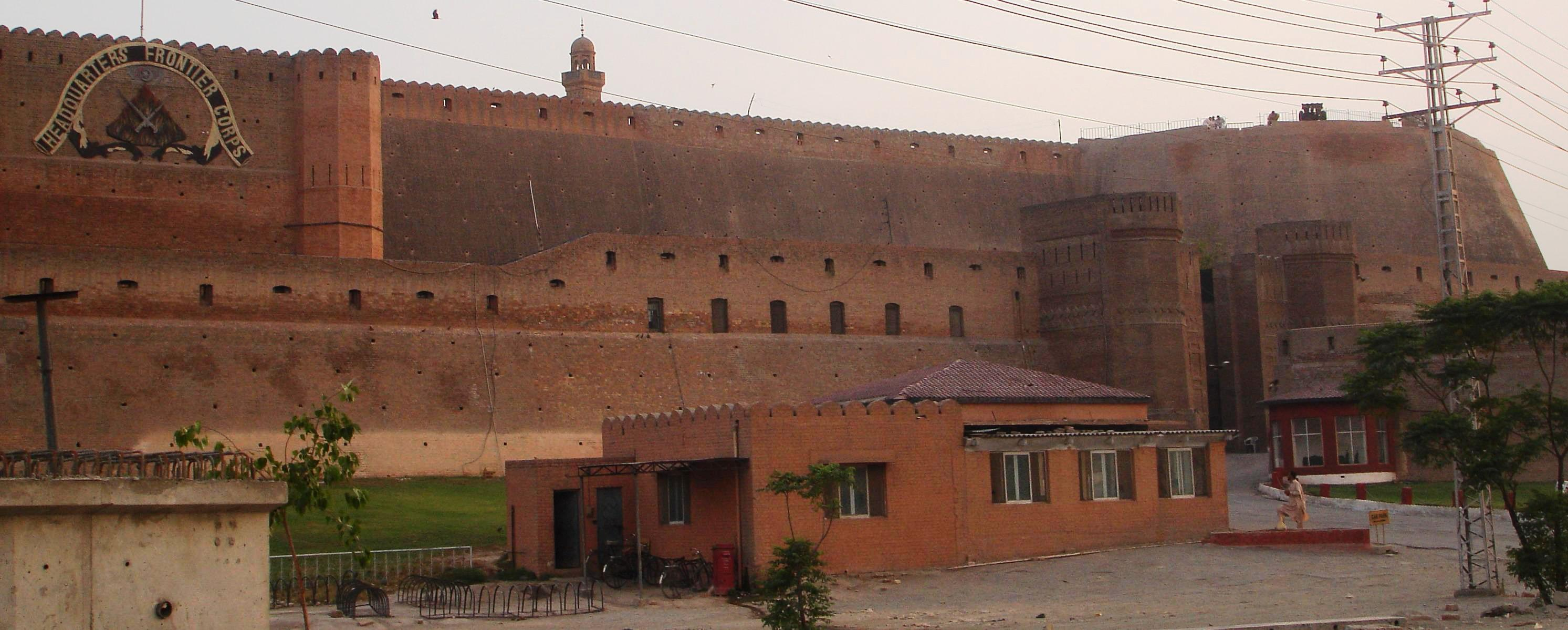
Bala Hissar Fort in Peshawar

Khyber Pakhtunkhwa is located in the northwest region of Pakistan. The province has a varied landscape ranging from rugged mountains and valleys to plain areas and dense agricultural farms. The region is well known for its rich historical background. There are a number of Buddhist archaeological sites from the Gandhara civilisation such as Takht Bhai and Pushkalavati, Bala Hisar Fort, Butkara Stupa, Kanishka stupa, Chakdara, Panjkora Valley and Sehri Bahlol.

Peshawar is the provincial capital of Khyber Pakhtunkhwa. The city is home to a number of sites including Bala Hisar Fort, Peshawar Museum, Gor Khuttree, Mohabbat Khan Mosque, Sethi Mohallah, Jamrud Fort, the Sphola Stupa and the most famous bazaar of Qissa Khawani. The city of Dera Ismail Khan, in the south of Khyber Pakhtunkhwa, is another city that is a junction entrance to the province of Punjab and Balochistan. This city is famous for its Hindu ruins at Kafir Kot.

The Buddhist ruins at Shahbaz Garhi are also famous in the city of Mardan (A region in the central part of Khyber Pakhtunkhwa).

In addition to the historically rich archeological sites, the region is also home to lush green mountains in the northern and east-southern parts. The most mesmerizing valleys in the north of this province include Kumrat Valley, Jahaz Banda, Usheri Valley, and Bin Shahi in Dir Upper and Lower districts; Kalam Valley, Marghazar Valley, Miandam, Malam Jabba, Gabin Jabba and Jarogo Waterfall in the Swat District; Shandur Pass, Bumburet, and Chitral National Park in the Chitral district.

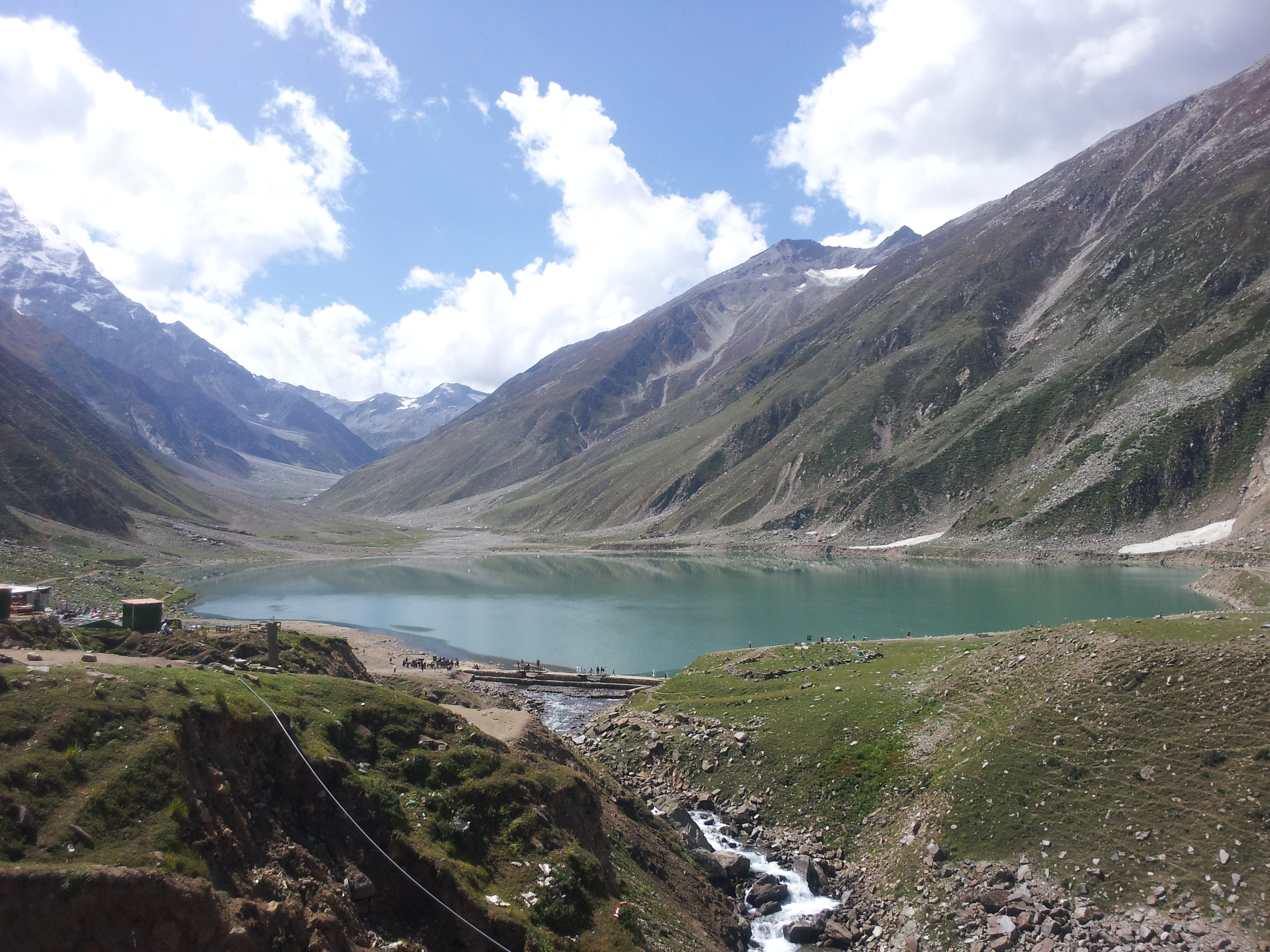
Saiful Muluk, Kaghan Valley

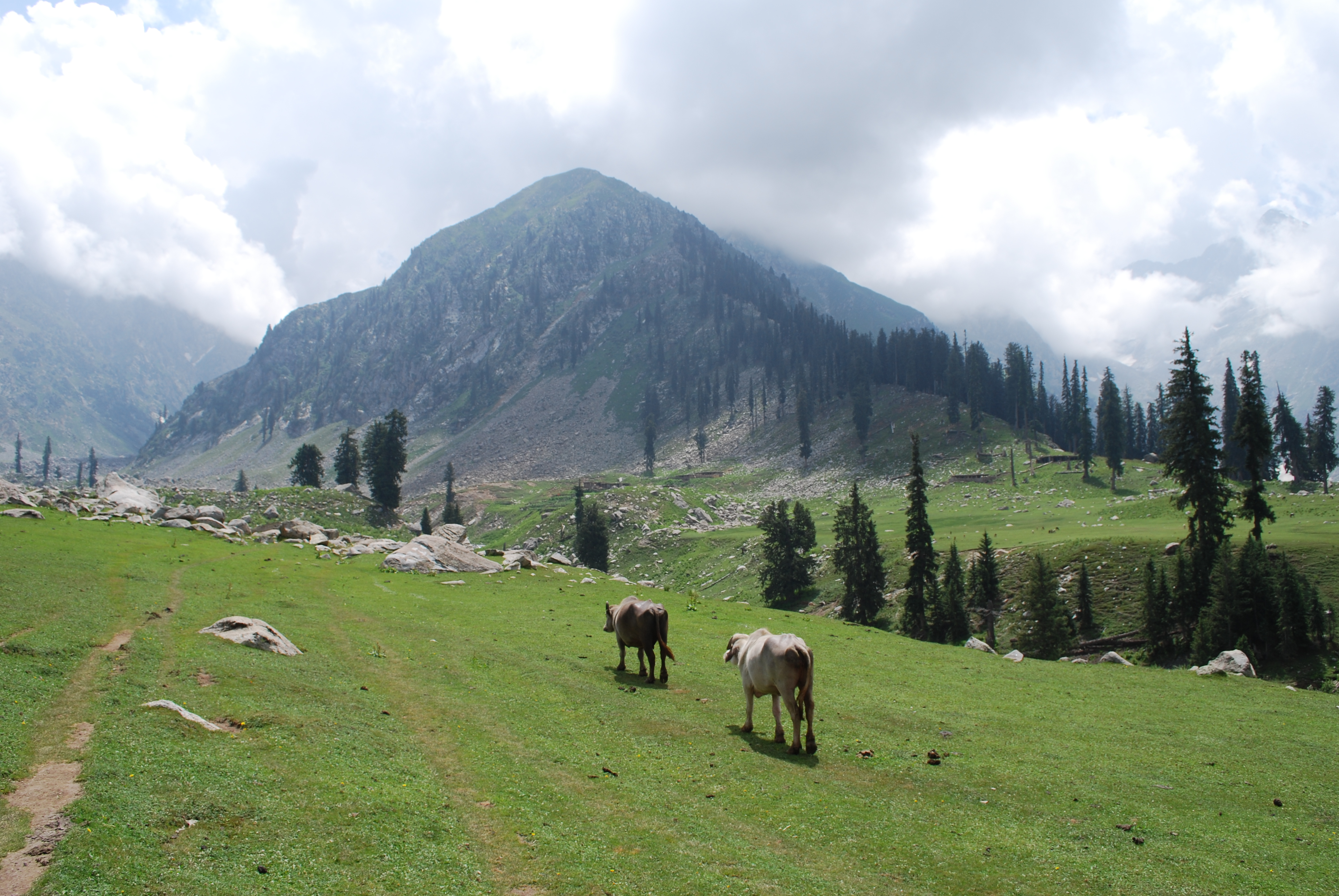
Kumrat Valley, Dir

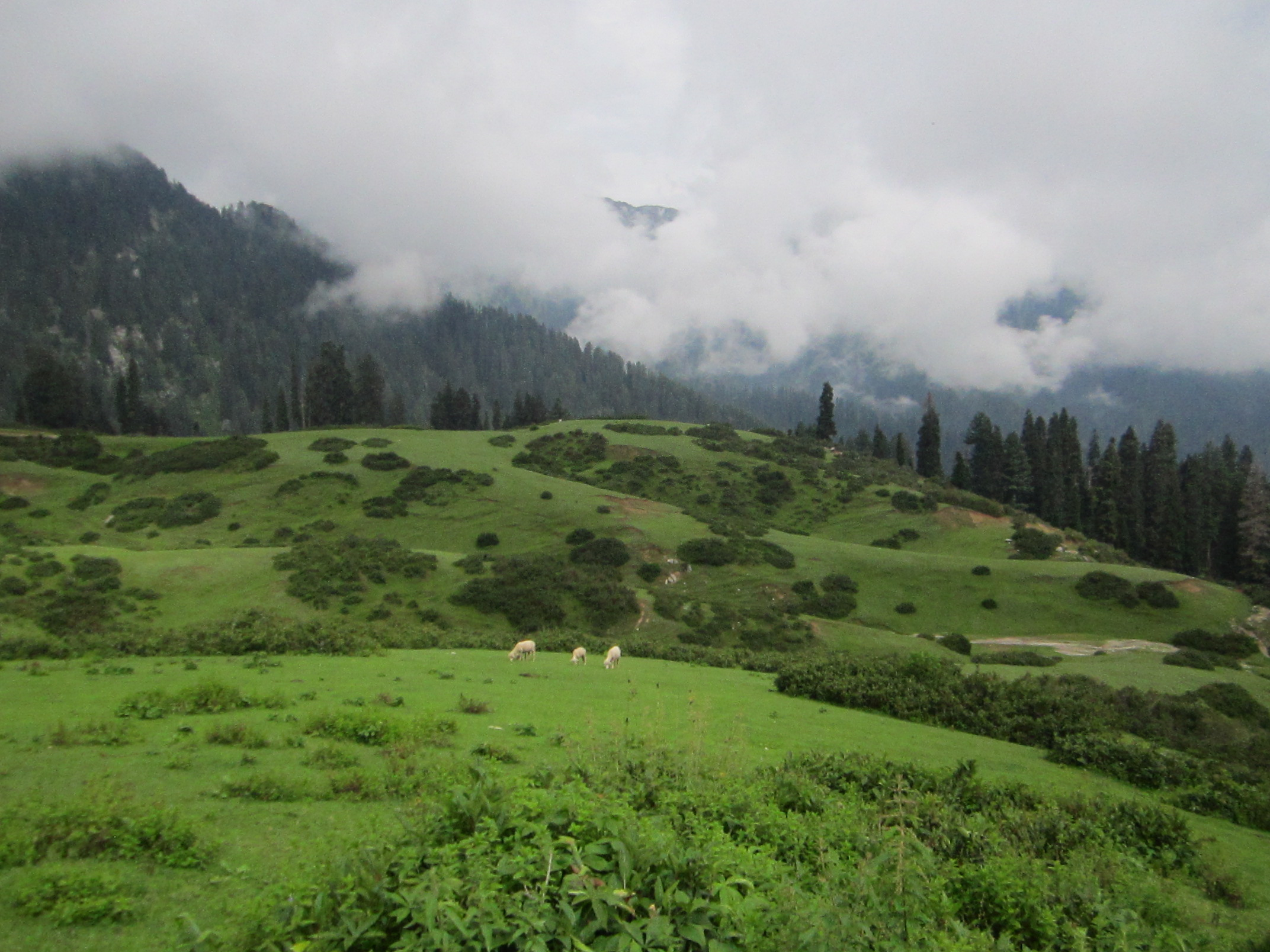
Gabina Jabba, Swat Valley

In the south-eastern part of the region, the district Mansehra is remarkable. This city is a major stay area for tourists setting out to the Northern Areas and Azad Kashmir. The city is connected with the famous Karakoram Highway which elongates up to the Kashgar area of China, connecting Pakistan to the ancient Silk Road. Along the route in the Mansehra region, there are several picturesque sights including the Kaghan Valley, Balakot, Naran, Shogran, Lake Saiful Mulook and Babusar Top.

There are also several other sites within the province which attract a large number of tourists every year including Ayubia, Nathia Gali, Mukeshpuri, Shangla, and Haripur.

Besides, there are number of passes that run through the province. One of them is the Khyber Pass which links Afghanistan with Pakistan. This trade route sees a large number of trucks and lorries importing and exporting goods in and out of the region. The Babusar Pass is another mountain pass, connecting the Thak Nala with Chilas on the Karakorum Highway. The Lowari Pass is another pass which connects Chitral with Dir amidst the giant mountains via the Lowari Tunnel. Another significant pass is the Shandur Pass, known as the "Highest Mountain Pass in Pakistan", which connects the Chitral region of Khyber Pakhtunkhwa to Gilgit. This pass is often called the "Roof of the World". The pass is the center of three mountain ranges – Hindukush, Pamir and Karakoram.

== Places of interest ==
=== Valleys ===
- Chitral Valley
- Kaghan Valley
- Kalam Valley
- Kumrat Valley
- Swat Valley

=== Lakes ===
The following are the accessible lakes;

- Ansoo Lake
- Daral Lake
- Dudipatsar
- Kundol Lake
- Mahodand Lake
- Jabba Zomalu Lake
- Katora Lake
- Lake Saiful Muluk
- Lulusar
- Pyala Lake

=== National Parks ===
- Broghil Valley National Park
- Chitral National Park
- Lulusar-Dudipatsar National Park
- Saiful Muluk National Park
- Sheikh Buddin National Park
- Bala Hissar Fort
- Chitral Fort
- Mahabat Khan Mosque
- Kafir Kot
- Khyber Pass
- Takht-i-Bahi

== Gallery ==
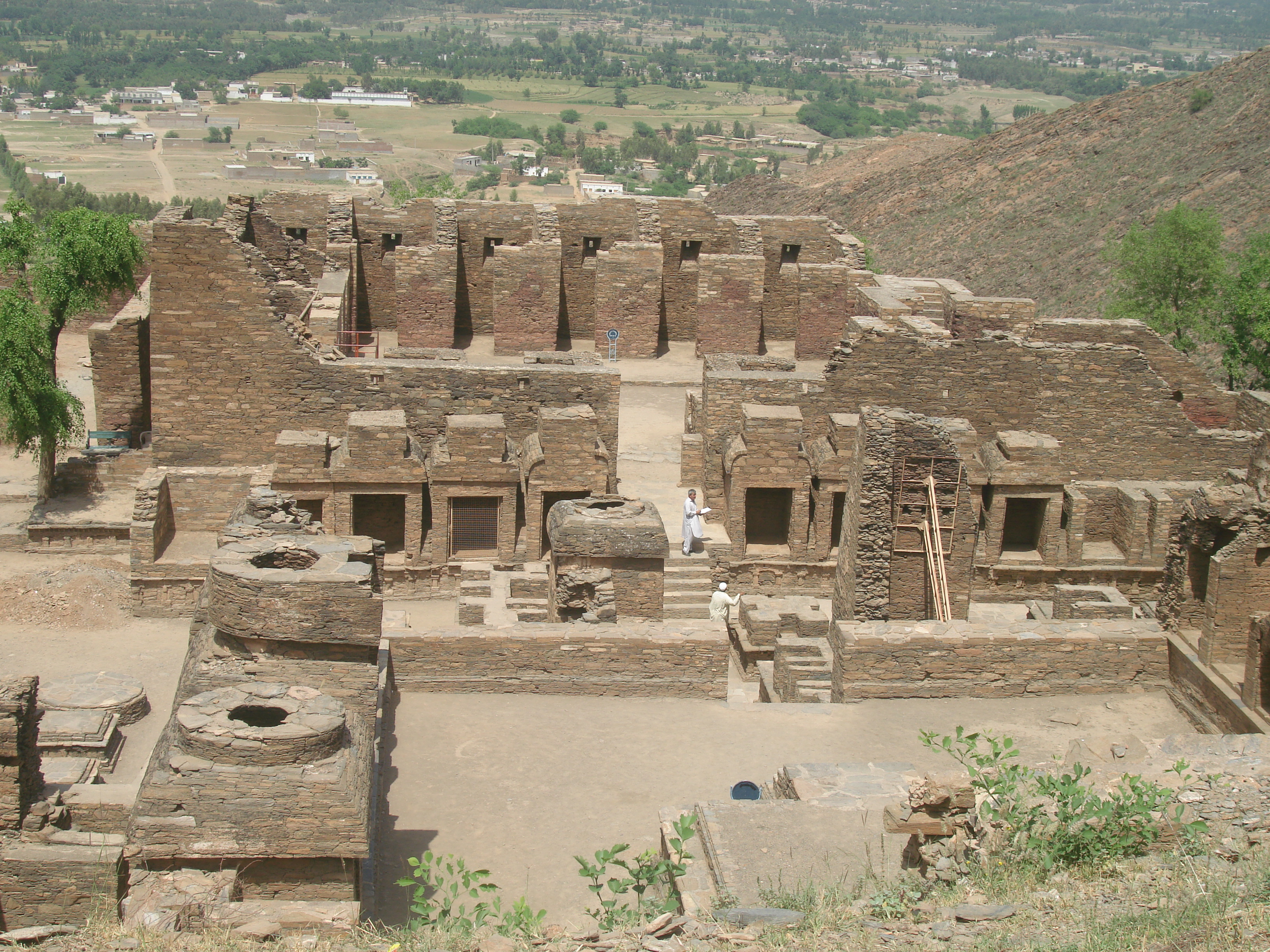
Takht-i-Bahi

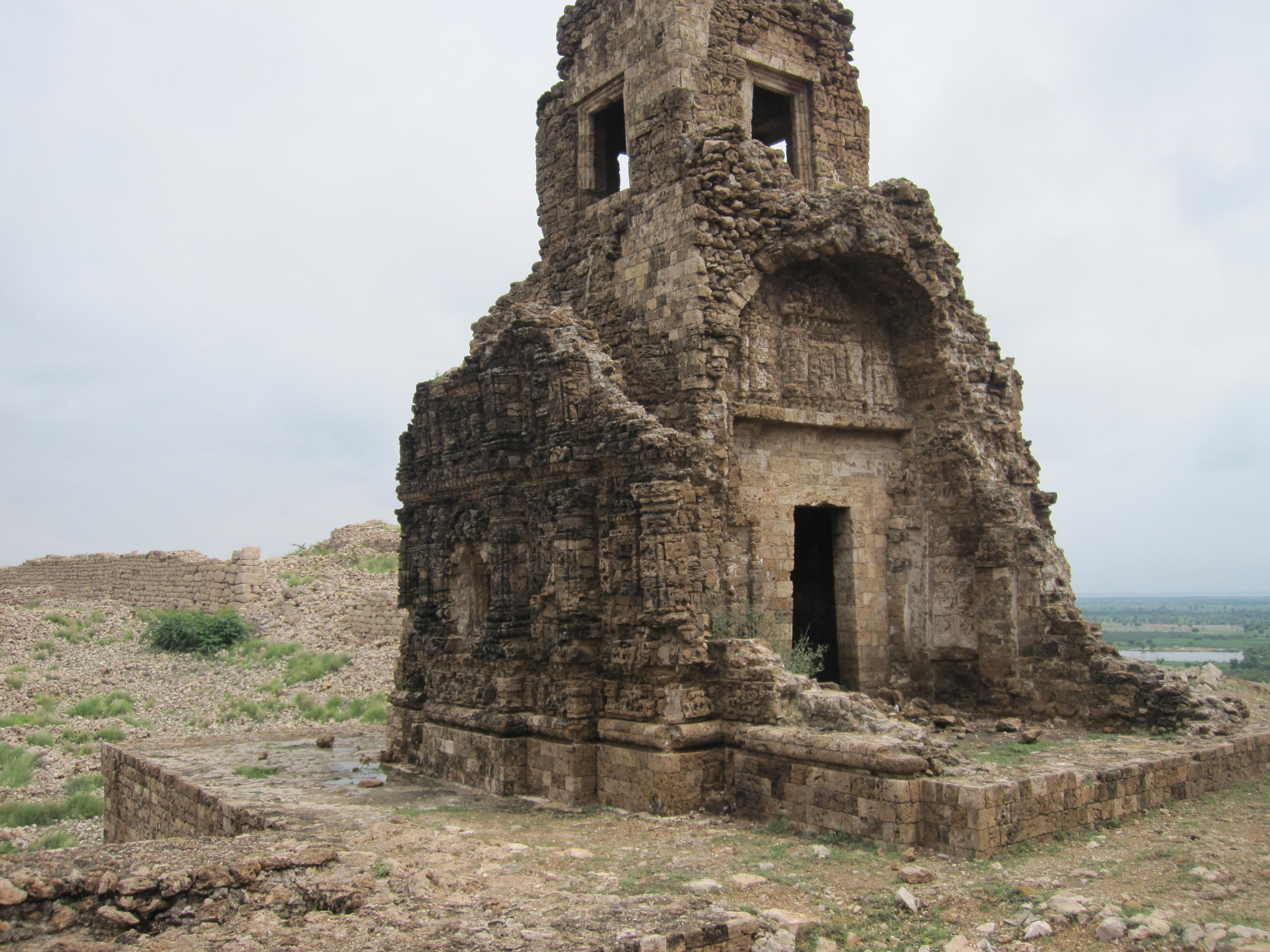
Kafirkot

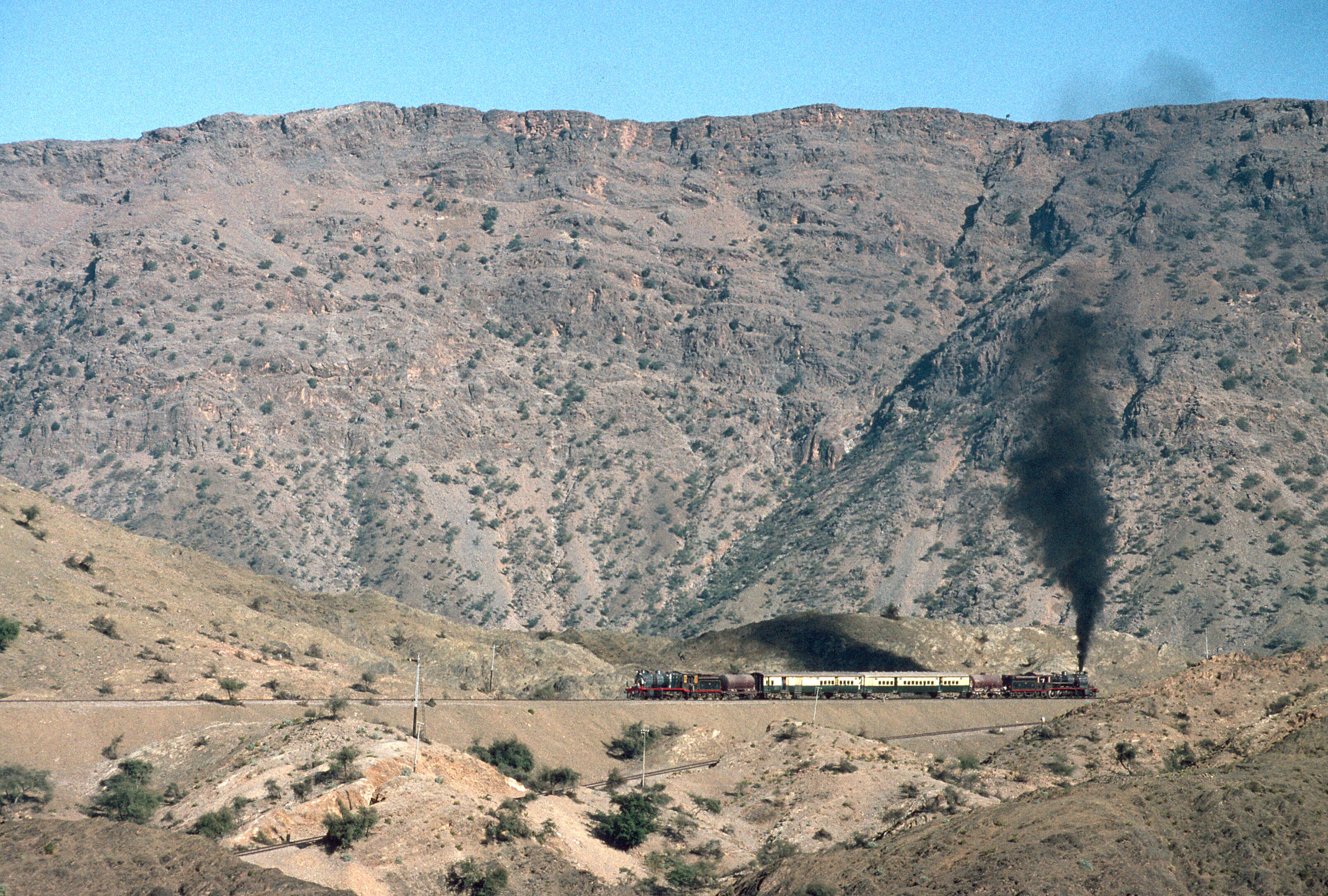
The famous Khyber steam train safari

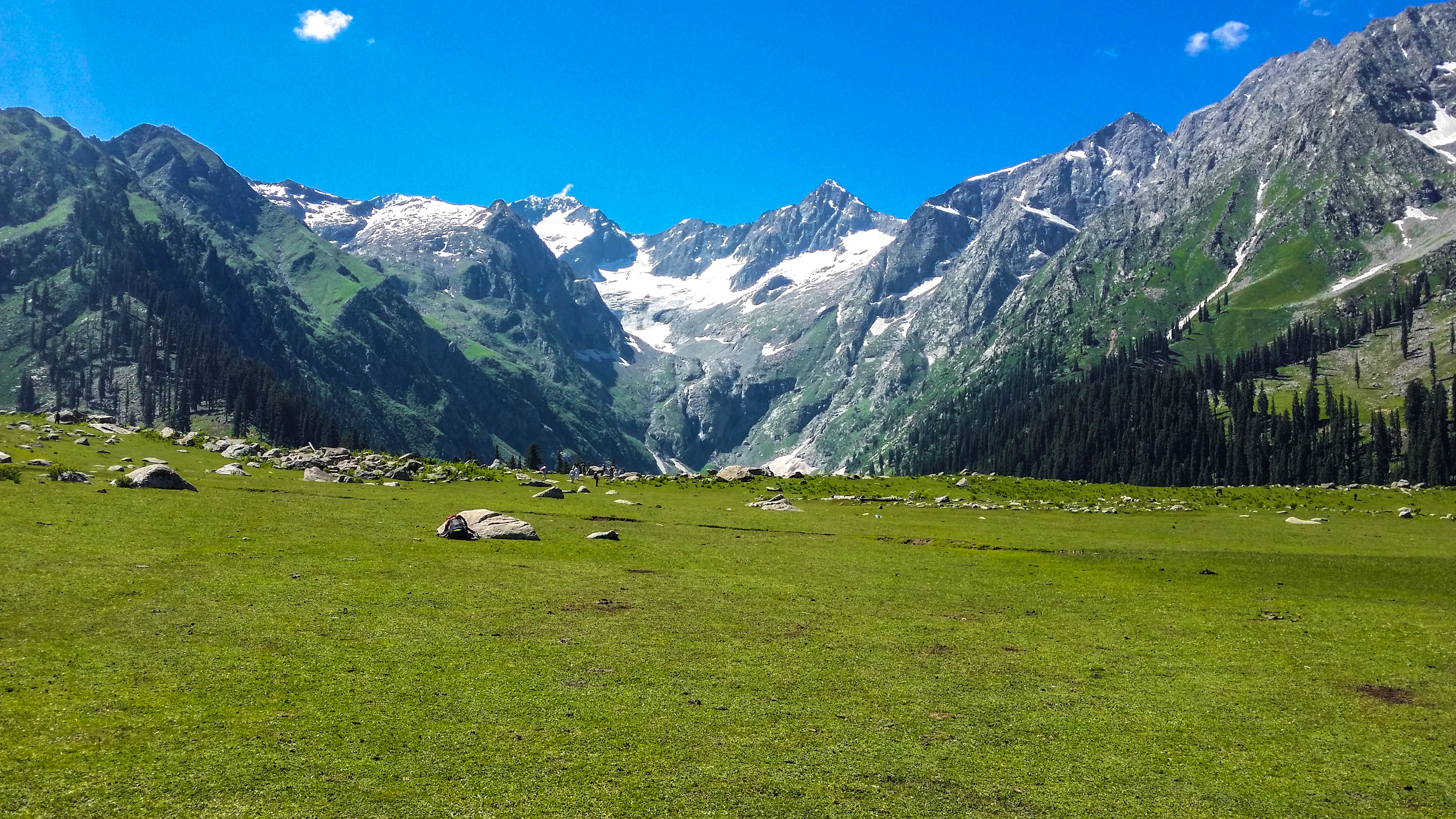
Jahaz Banda, Kumrat Valley

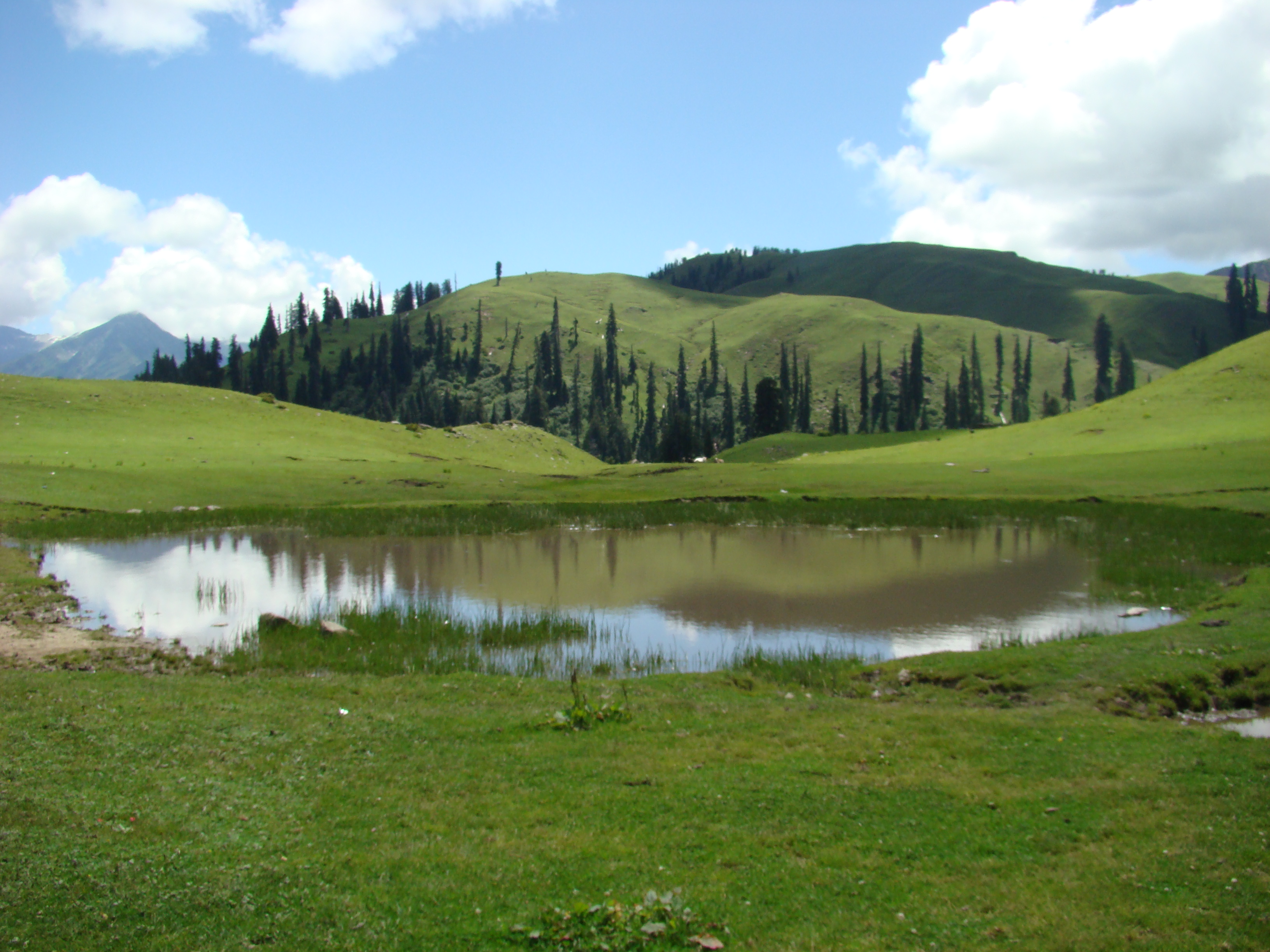
Shogran, Kaghan Valley

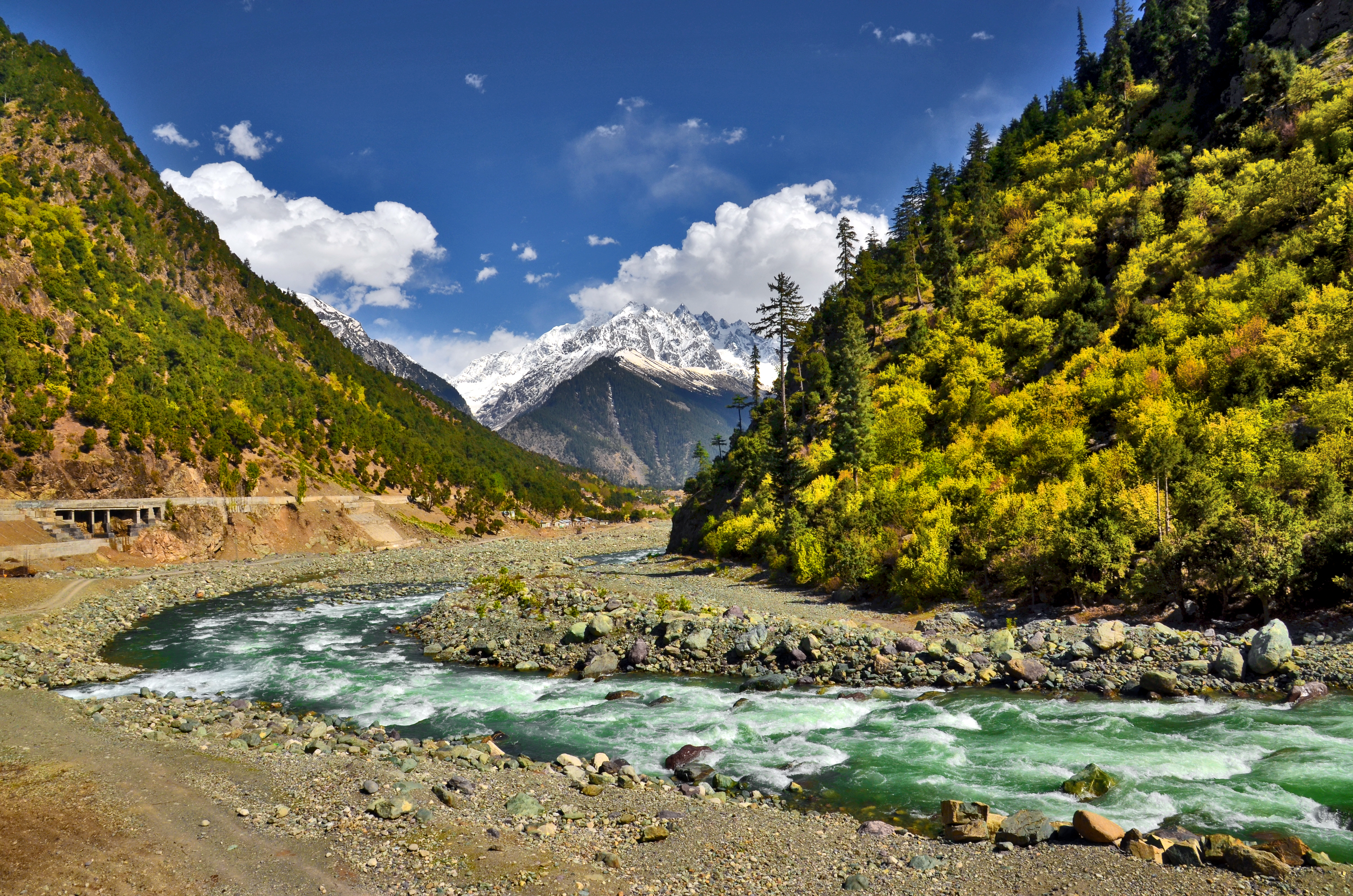
Kalam valley

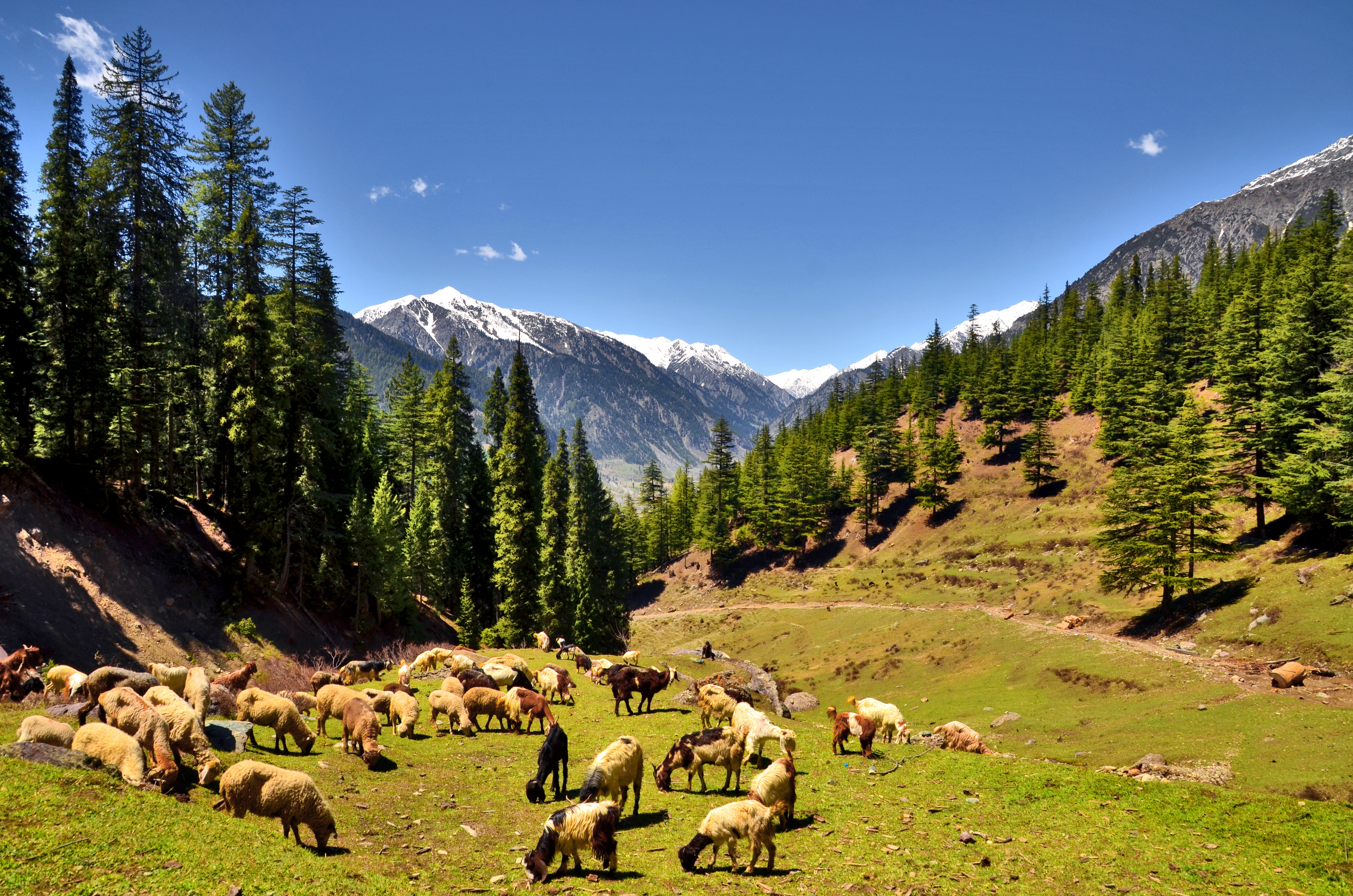
Swat Valley

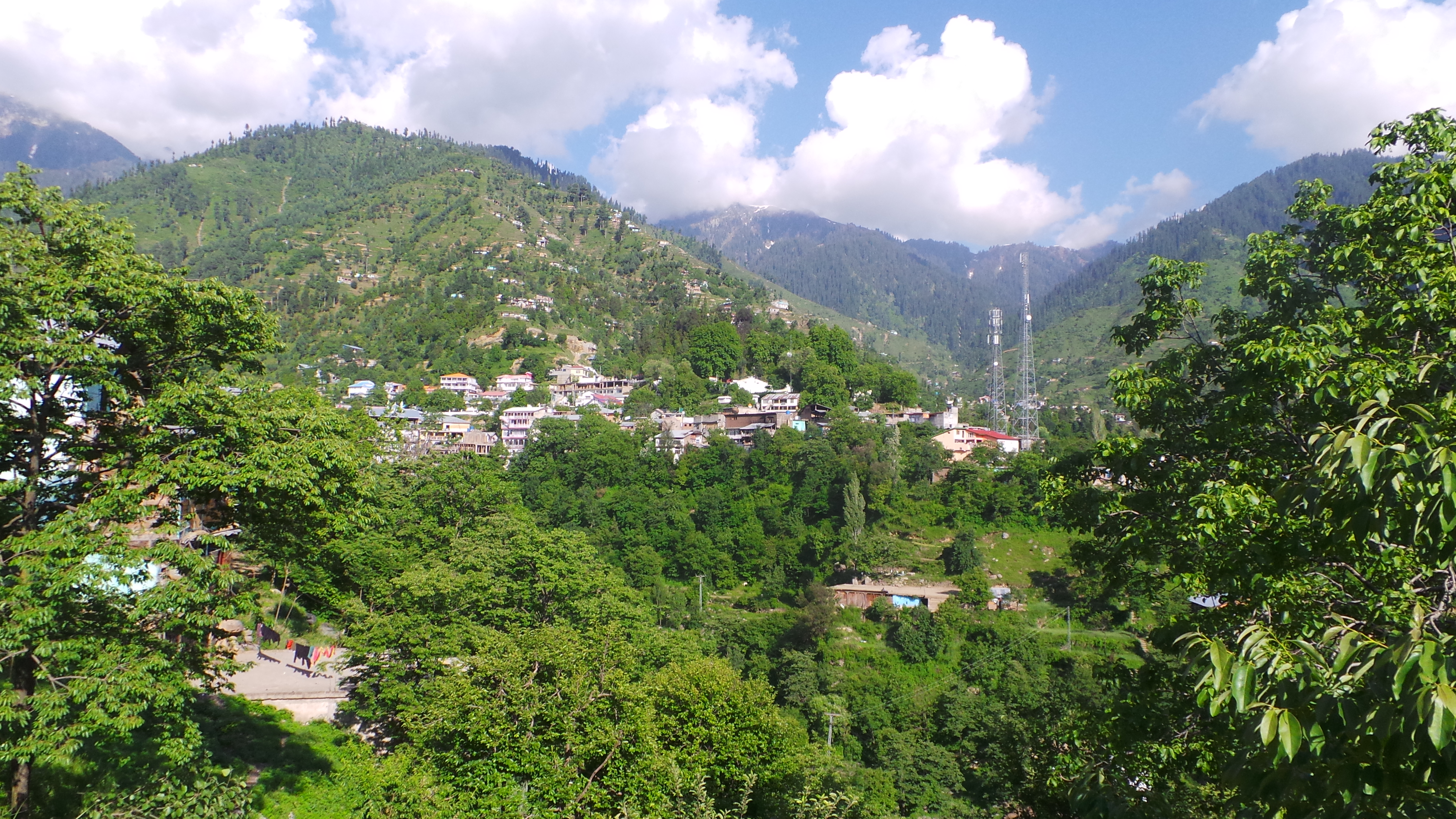
Miandam Swat Valley

== See also ==
- Tourism in Pakistan
  - Tourism in Punjab, Pakistan
  - Tourism in Sindh
  - Tourism in Balochistan, Pakistan
  - Tourism in Azad Kashmir
  - Tourism in Gilgit-Baltistan
  - Tourism in Karachi
