= Tourism in Punjab, Pakistan =

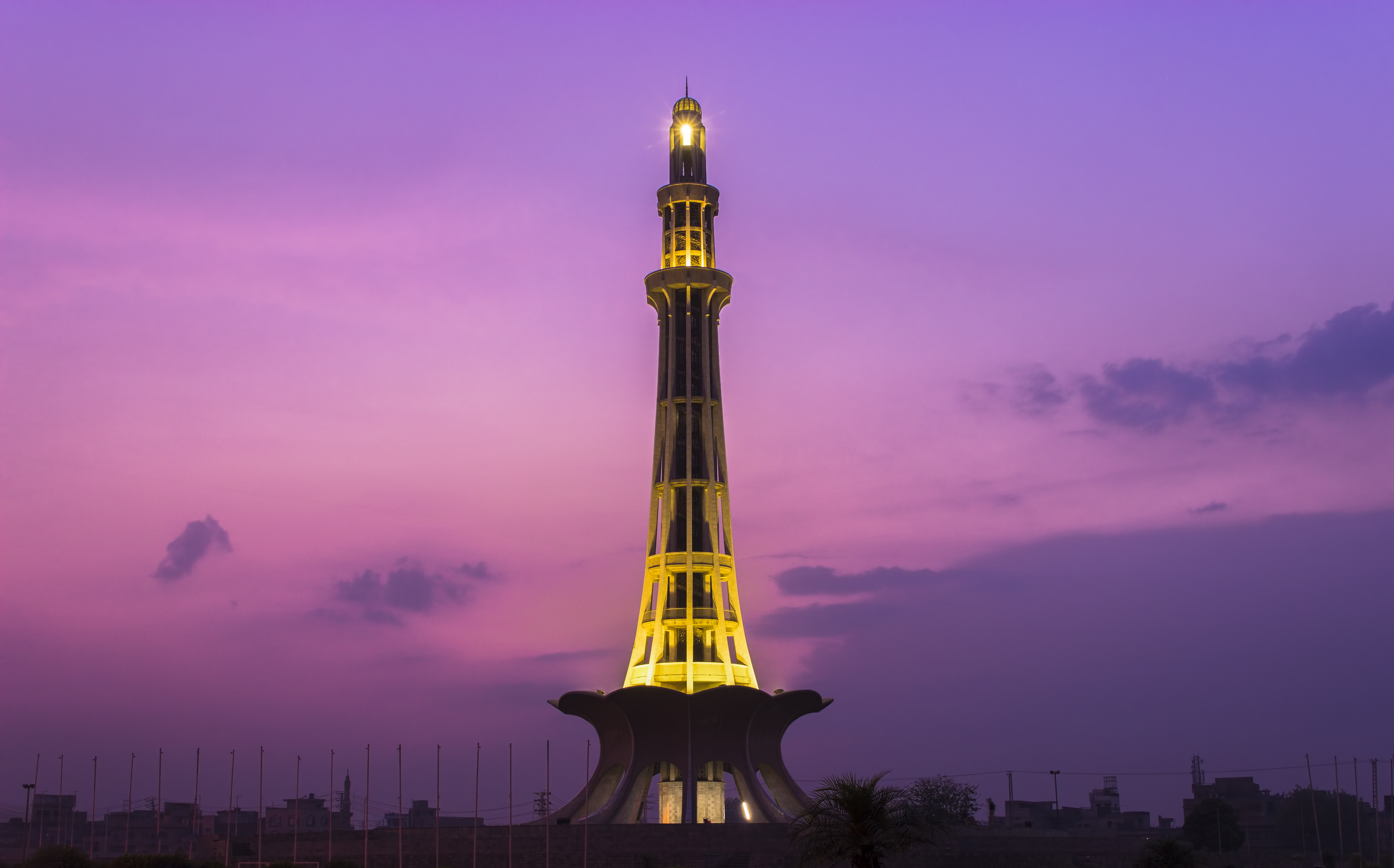
Minar-e-Pakistan is located in Lahore, Capital of Punjab

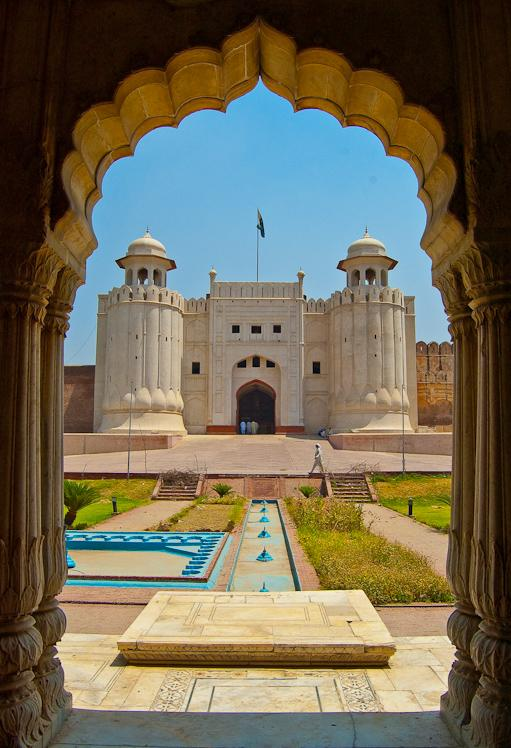
Lahore Fort in Punjab

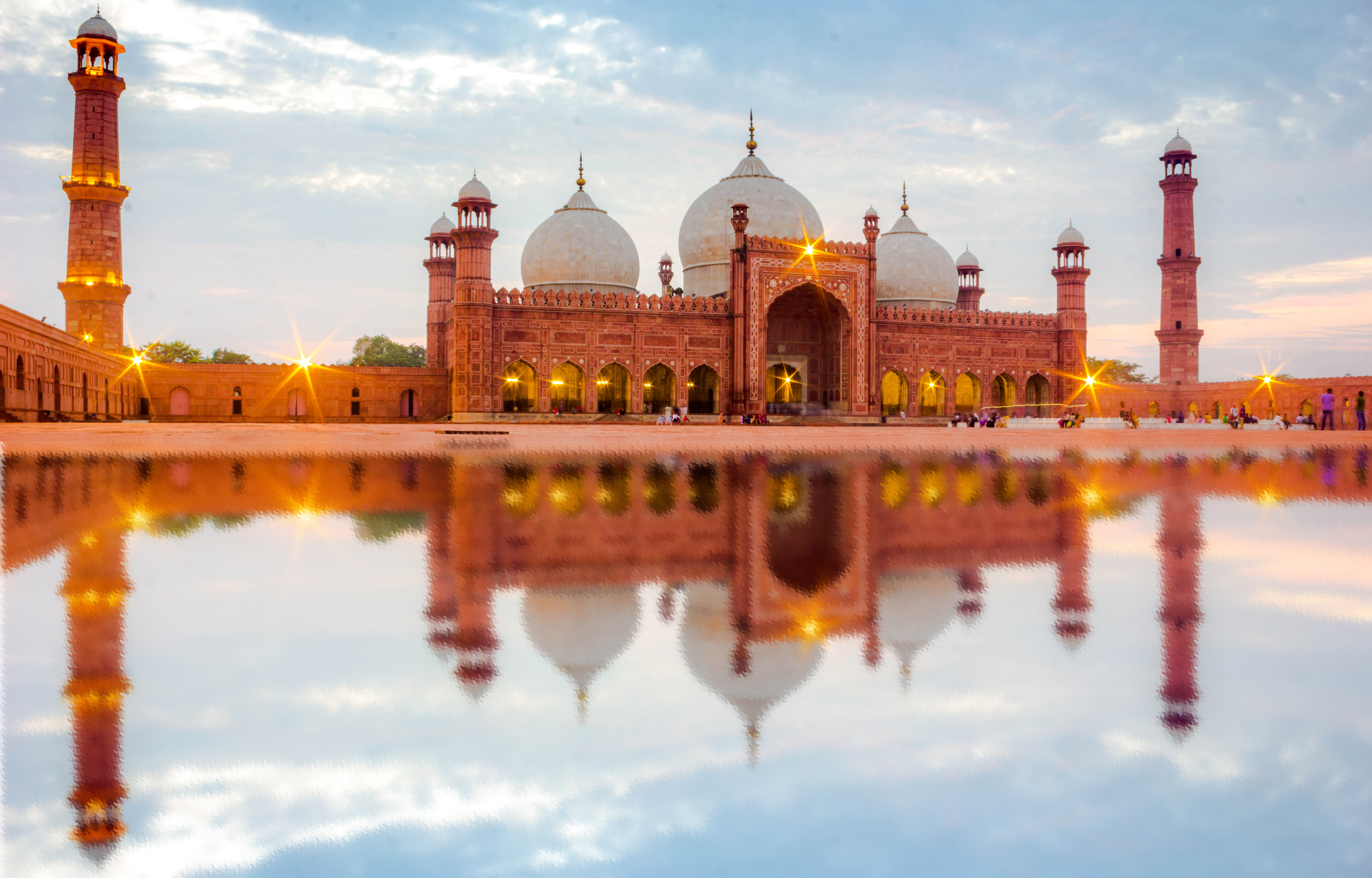
Badshahi Mosque, Lahore

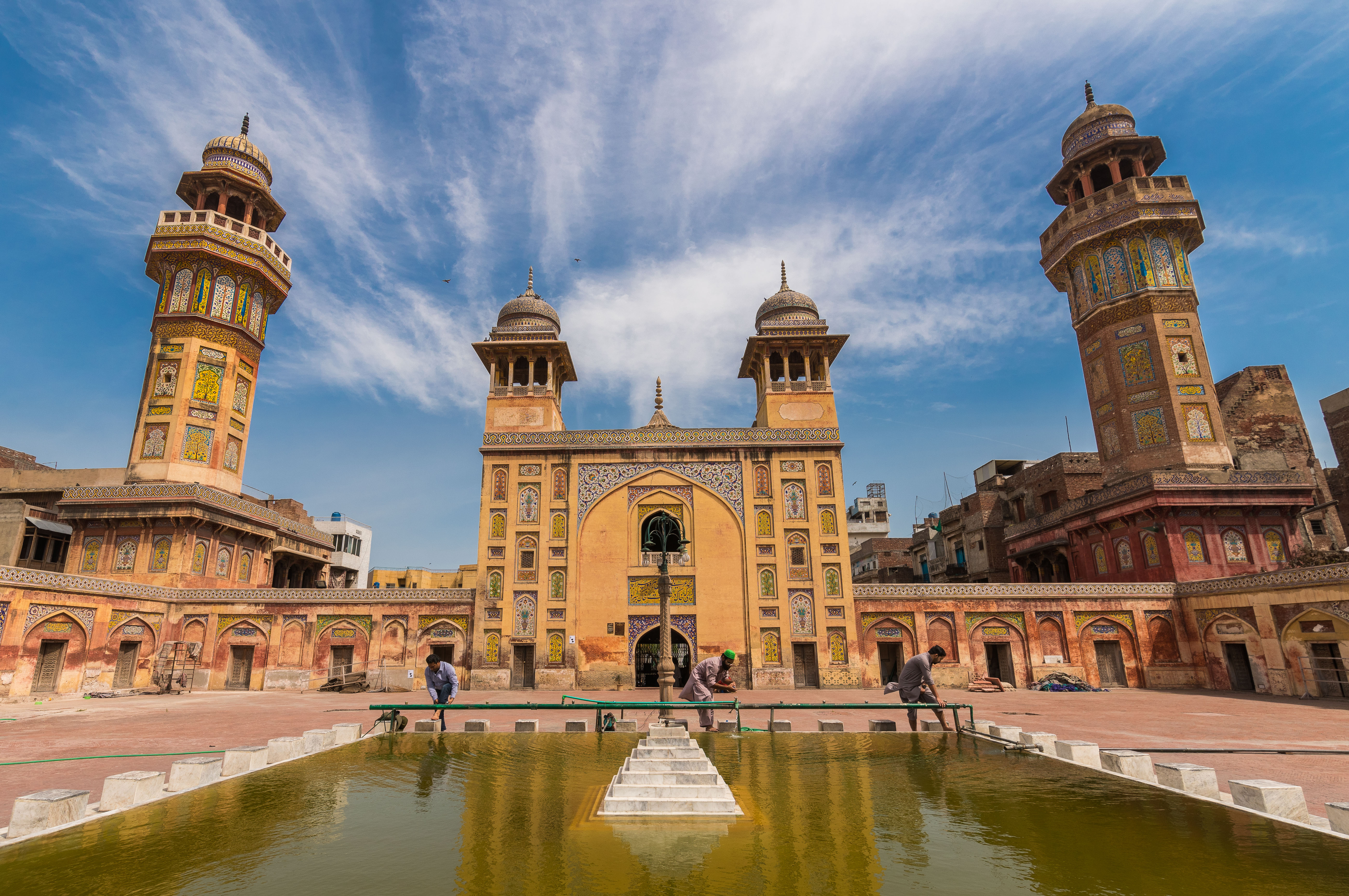
Wazir Khan Mosque, Lahore

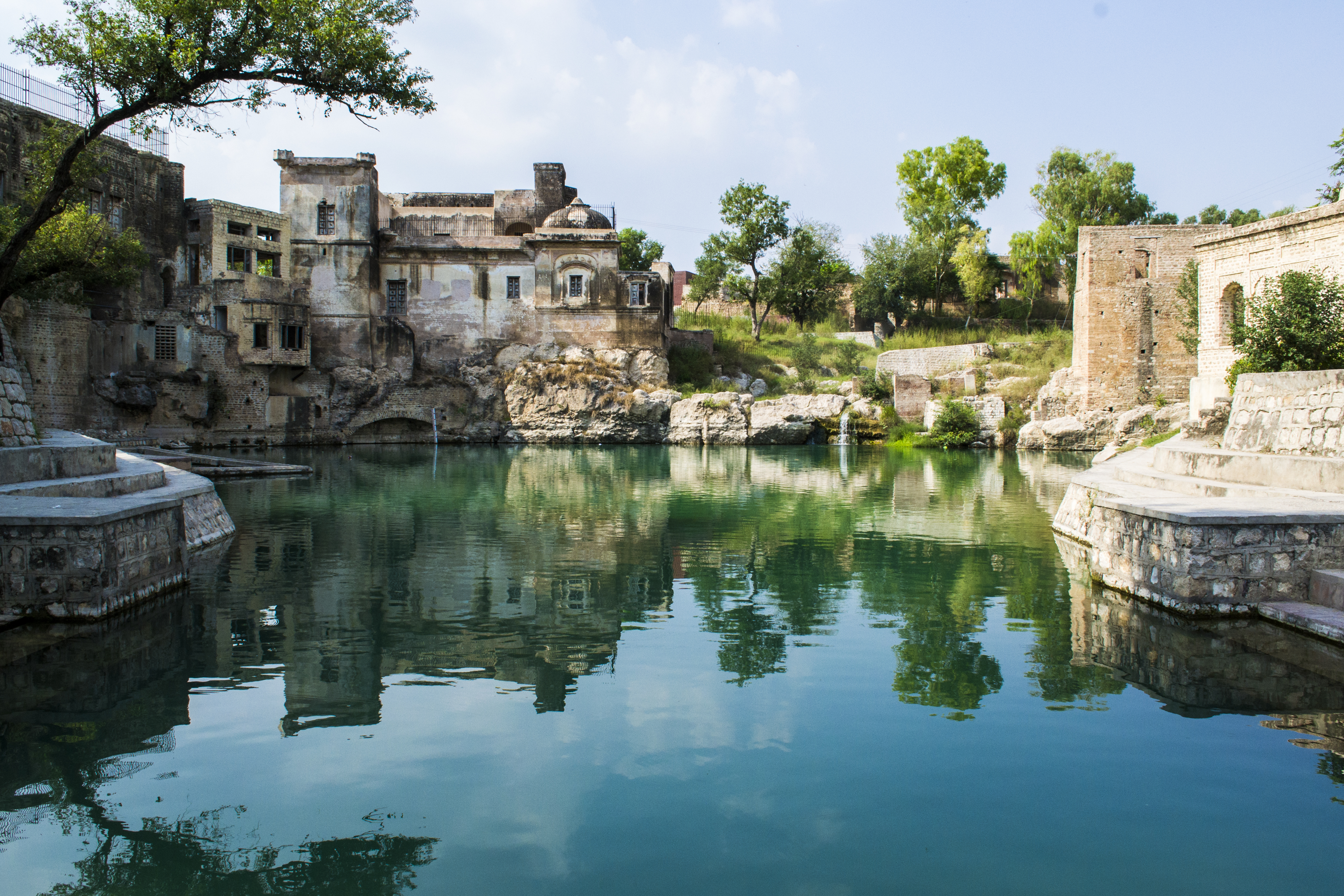
The Katasraj temple in Chakwal

Punjab is the largest province in population and the second largest province in physical size in Pakistan. In 2017, 1.75 million tourists visited Pakistan according to the World Travel and Tourism Council.

It is known for its ancient cultural heritage as well as its religious diversity. The lands of Punjab have been home to a number of religions and civilisations. The Indus Valley civilization once ruled the region and a significant archaeological find was discovered at the ancient city of Harrapa. The Gandhara civilisation was also quite dominant in the northern region of Punjab at the site of Taxila. Several other civilisations such as Greeks, Central Asians, and Persians ruled Punjab leaving a number of sites which still exist today. The arrival of Islam came about during the rule of the Umayyad Caliphate (arrival of Muhammad bin Qasim in early 8th century) followed by the Ghaznavids. The Mughals took control of the region later and ruled its land for several centuries. The mughal heritage remained quite strong in Punjab with a large number of forts, tombs and monuments still intact today.

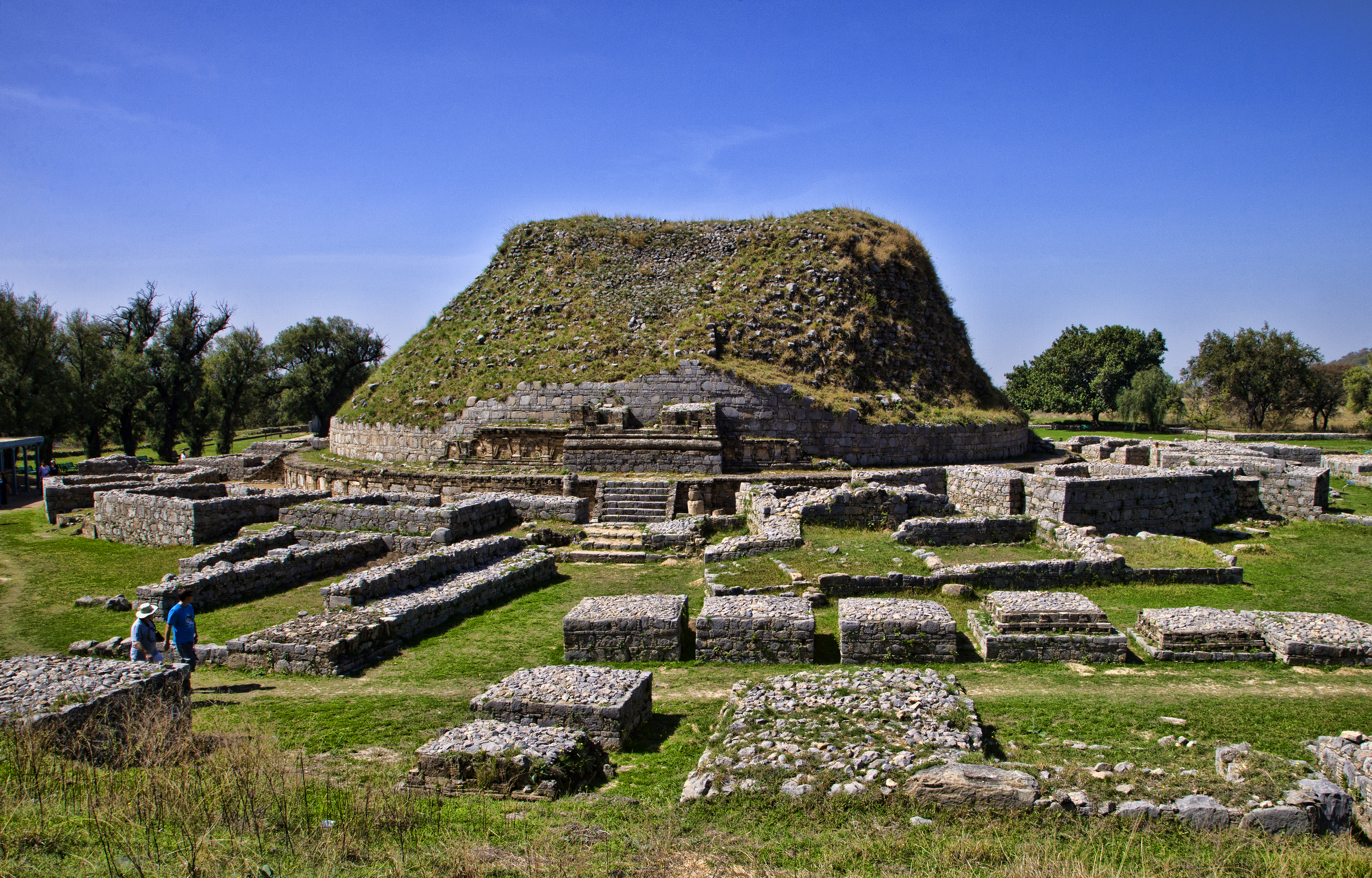
The Dharmarajika Stupa, a Mauryan-era Buddhist stupa in Taxila

The Durrani Empire ruled the Punjab at the fall of the Mughal Empire for a short period followed by the rise of the Sikh Empire in the 19th century. The strong control of the Sikhs also led to a number of sites still remaining intact throughout Punjab. The British Raj took control of the region until the independence of British India in 1947.

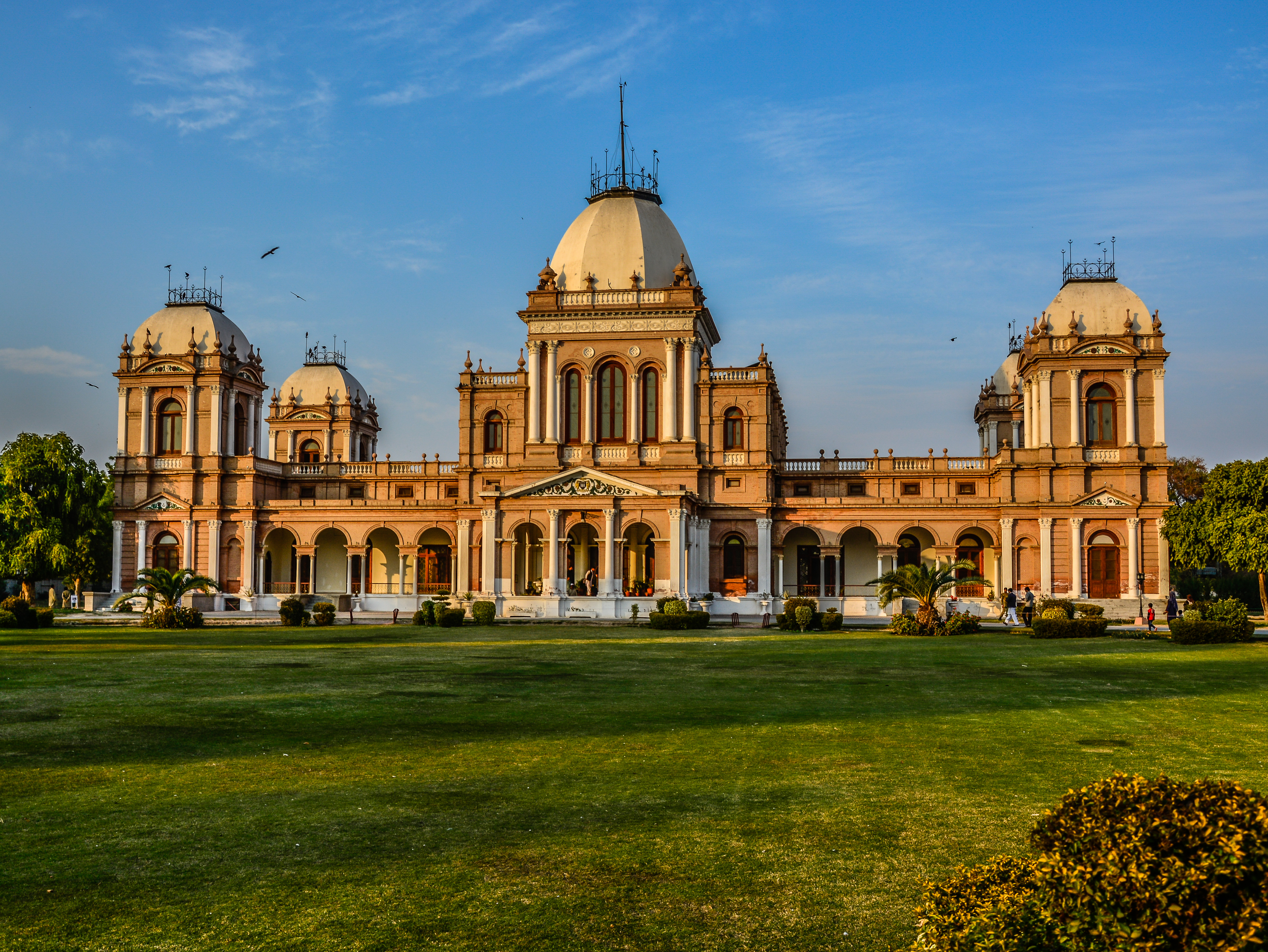
The 1872-built Italian chateau Noor Mahal (Diamond Palace) in Bahawalpur

Tourism in Punjab is regulated by the Tourism Development Corporation of Punjab. There are a number of large cosmopolitan cities in Punjab. The provincial capital, Lahore is the second largest city of Pakistan as is known to the Cultural Heart of Pakistan. The Mughal Empire left behind the Lahore Fort and Shalimar Gardens which are now recognised World Heritage Sites. The Walled City of Lahore, Badshahi Mosque, Wazir Khan Mosque, Tomb of Jahangir and Nur Jahan, Tomb of Asaf Khan and Chauburji are other major sites visited by tourists each year. The tomb of Qutb-ud-din Aibak from the Delhi Sultanate is located in the historical market of Anarkali Bazaar in Lahore. The Samadhi of Ranjit Singh and Hazuri Bagh Baradari are prime example of Sikh architecture during the rule of the Sikh Empire. There a number of other sites within Lahore such as Minar-e-Pakistan, Lahore Museum, Data Durbar Complex, Tomb of Muhammad Iqbal, Bagh-e-Jinnah, Lahore Zoo, Tomb of Shah Jamal, Sukh Chayn Gardens, Bahria Town, Emporium Mall, Lake City, Canal Gardens, and Gaddafi Stadium, which all attract a large number of visitors annually.

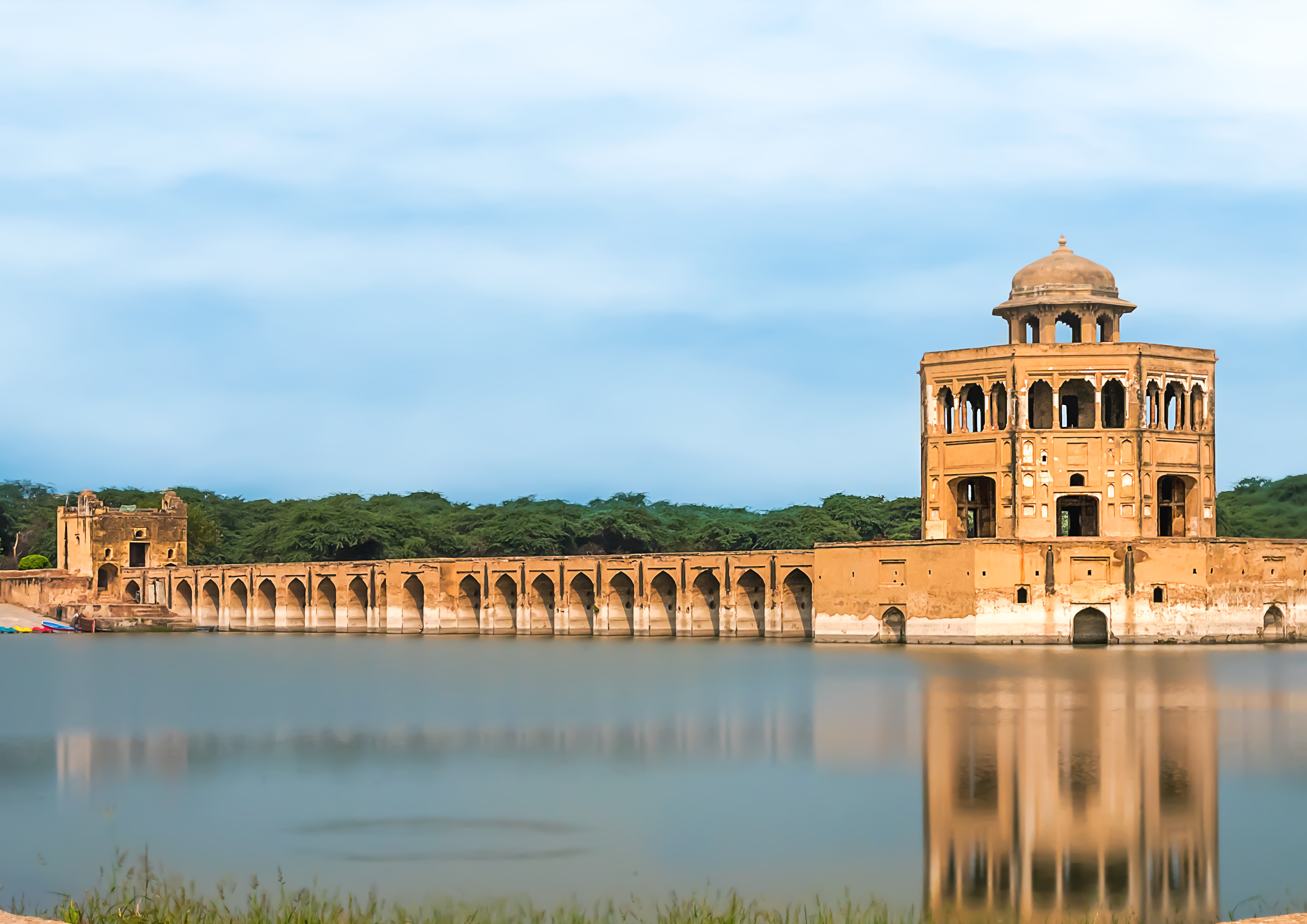
Hiran Minar, Sheikhupura, Punjab

Rawalpindi is known to be a famous hill station stop for tourists before setting out to Murree, Bhurban, Patriata, Northern Areas, Azad Kashmir and Gilgit-Baltistan. The Pharwala Fort is a major fort on the outskirts of the city built by an ancient Hindu civilisation. There are a number of sites from the Mughal Empire in the city of Sheikhupura called Hiran Minar and the Sheikhupura Fort. The Rohtas Fort near Jhelum is a major fort built by Sher Shah Suri is a World Heritage Site. The Katasraj temple in the city of Chakwal is a major destination for Hindu devotees. The Khewra Salt Mines is another major tourist attraction as its one of the oldest mines in South Asia. The city of Nankana Sahib is birthplace of the founder of Sikhism. The Gurdwara is visited by a number of pilgrims ever year to mark Guru Nanak Dev birthday. Another famous gurdwara in Punjab is Panja Sahib located in the city of Hasan Abdal. The clock tower and eight bazaars of Faisalabad are famous for its bazaars since they were designed to represent the Union Jack flag.

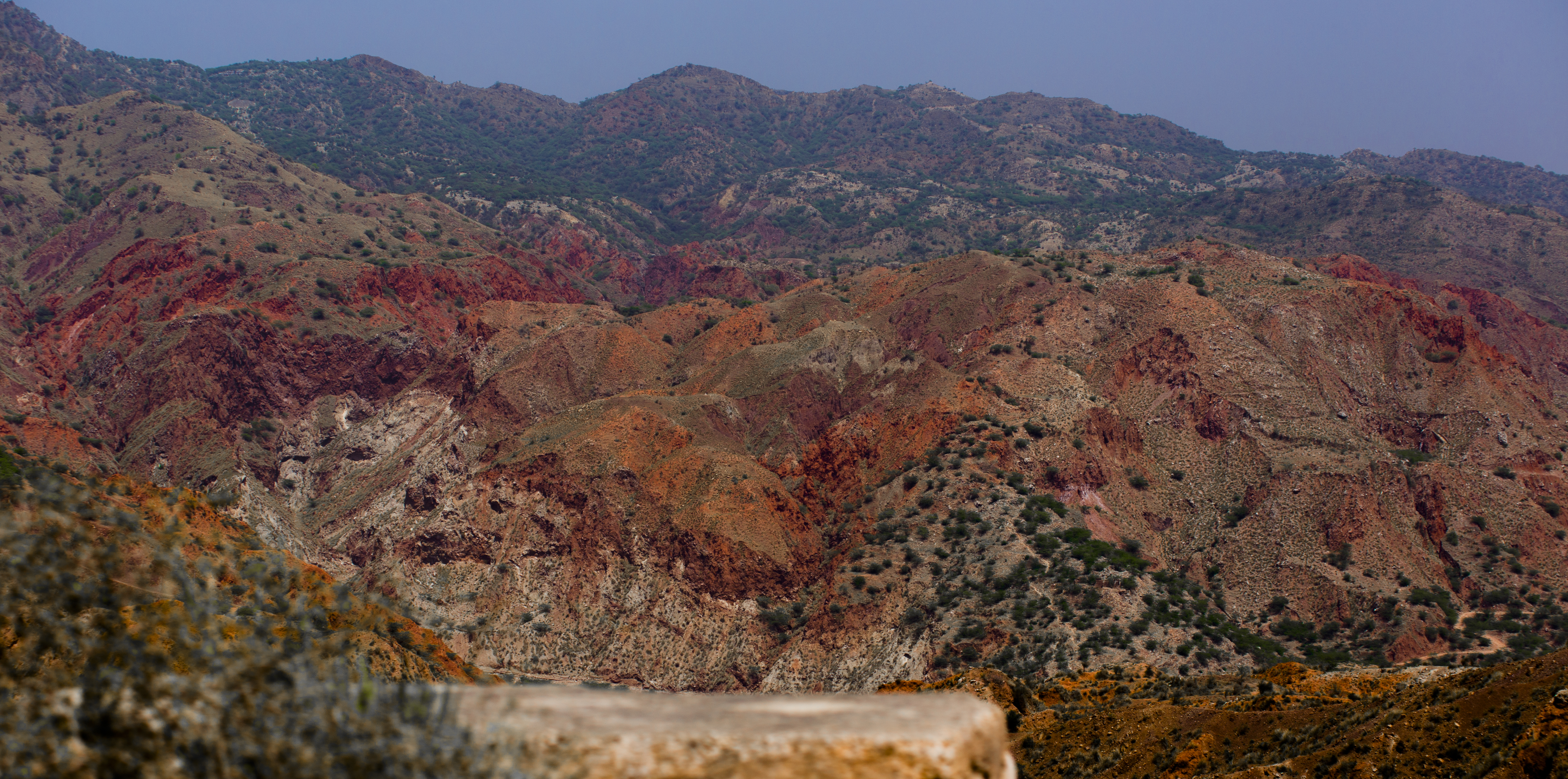
Khewra Salt Mines

Travelling southwards, the region starts to become more desertic. Multan is another major tourist destination in Punjab. It is known for its mausoleums of saints and Sufi pirs. The most famous being the Rukn-e-Alam and Baha-ud-din Zakariya. The Multan Museum and Nuagaza tombs are so significant attractions in the city. The city of Bahwalpur is a major destination as it is located near the Cholistan Desert and Thar Desert. The Derawar Fort is a large fort built in the Cholistan Desert which is also the site for the annual Cholistan Jeep Rally. The city is also near the ancient site of Uch Sharif which was once a Delhi Sultanate stronghold. The Noor Mahal, Sadiq Ghar Palace, Darbar Mall are large palaces built during the reign of the Nawabs. The Lal Suhanra National Park is a major zoological garden on the outskirts of the city.

== Places of interest ==
=== Historical Sites ===
- Lahore Fort
- Harrapa
- Taxila
- Chauburji
- Attock Fort
- Derawar Fort
- Rohtas Fort, Jhelum
- Noor Mahal
- Hiran Minar, Sheikhupura
- Katas Raj Temples
- Khewra Salt Mine
- Shalimar Gardens
- Tomb of Jahangir and his wife Nur Jahan and her brother Asif Khan
- Uch

=== Hilly Areas ===
- Murree
- Bhurban
- Patriata
- Fort Munro
- Kotli Sattian
- Kahuta

=== Lakes ===
- Khabikki Lake
- Namal Lake
- Uchhali Lake
- Swaik Lake

=== Valleys ===
- Phugla
- Soan Sakaser Valley
- Soon Valley

=== Rivers ===
- Indus River
- Chenab River
- Sutlaj River
- Ravi River
- Jhelum River
- Bunhar River
- Korang River
- Soan River
- Swan River
- Panjnad River

== See also ==
- Tourism in Pakistan
  - Tourism in Balochistan, Pakistan
  - Tourism in Sindh
  - Tourism in Khyber Pakhtunkhwa
  - Tourism in Azad Kashmir
  - Tourism in Gilgit-Baltistan
  - Tourism in Karachi
