= Lists of tourist attractions =

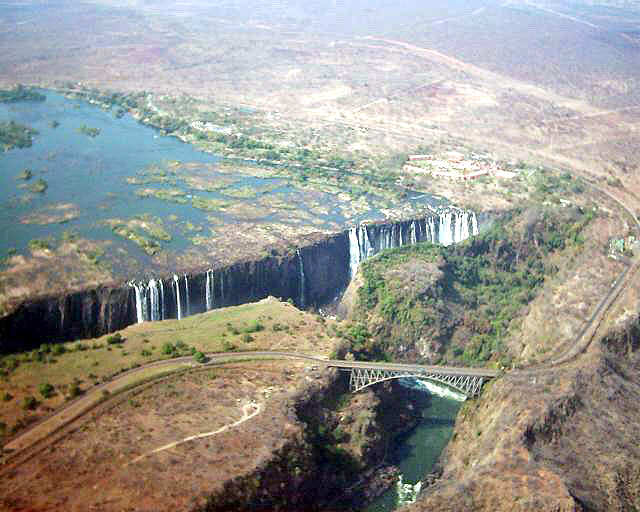
Victoria Falls, Zimbabwe

The following are lists of tourist attractions. Tourist attractions are grouped both by type and by country.

== By type ==
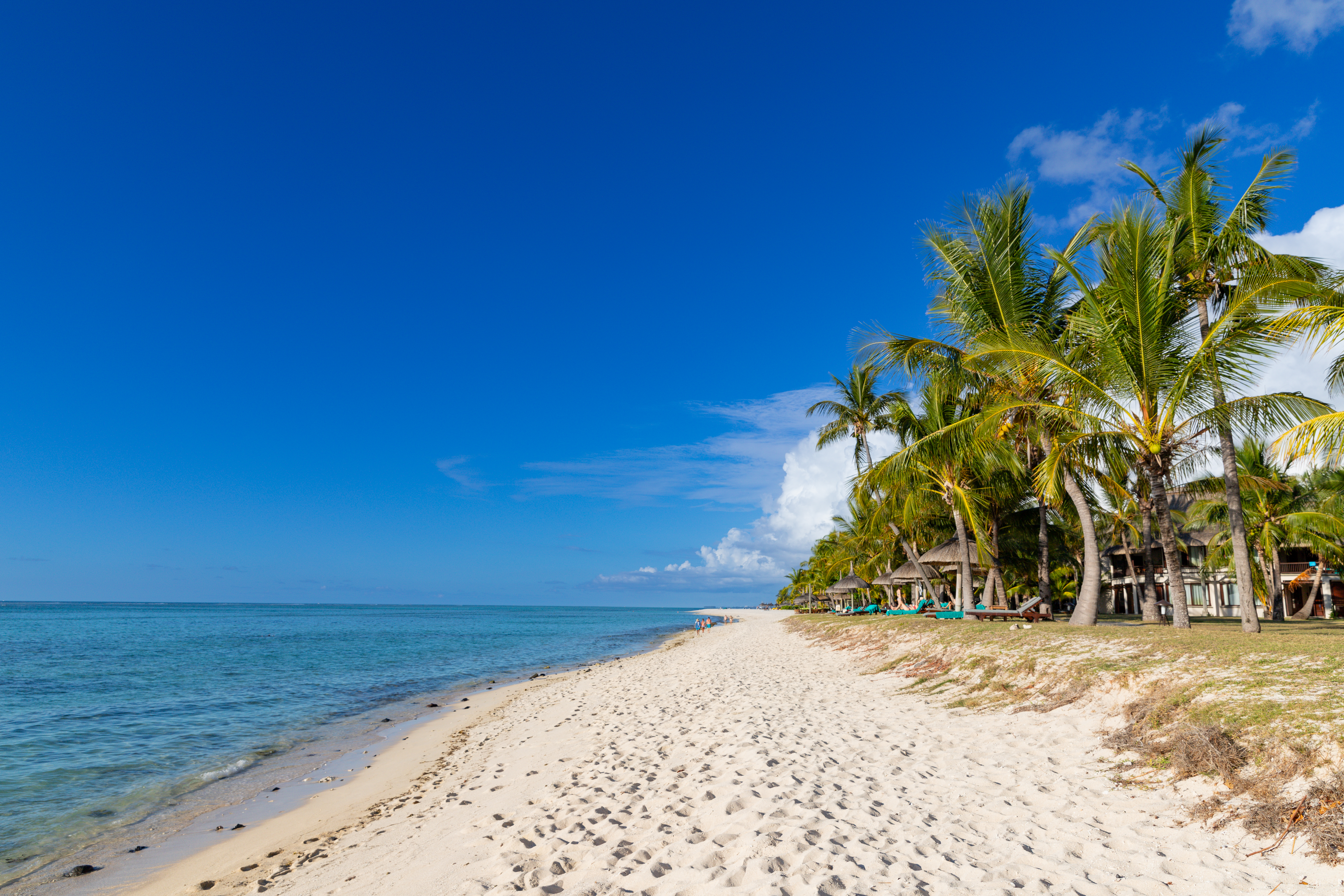
Le Morne beach (Mauritius)

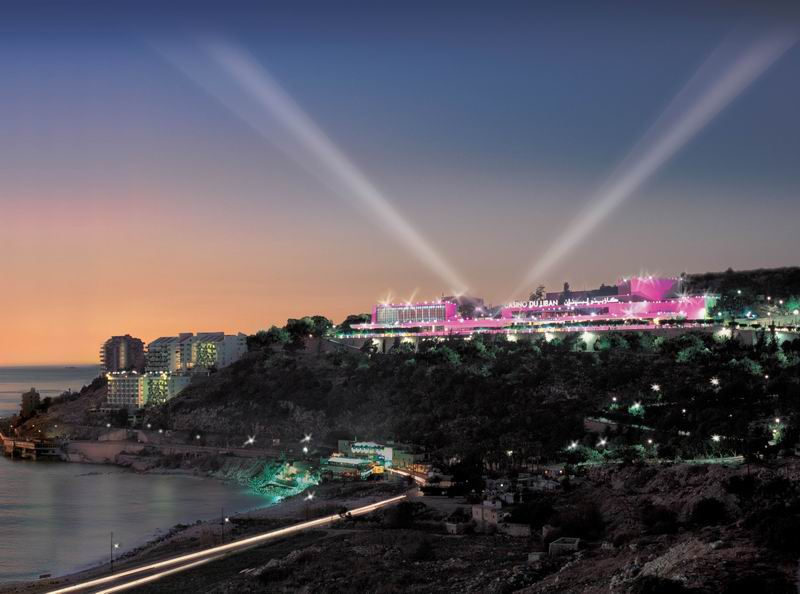
Casino du Liban, Lebanon

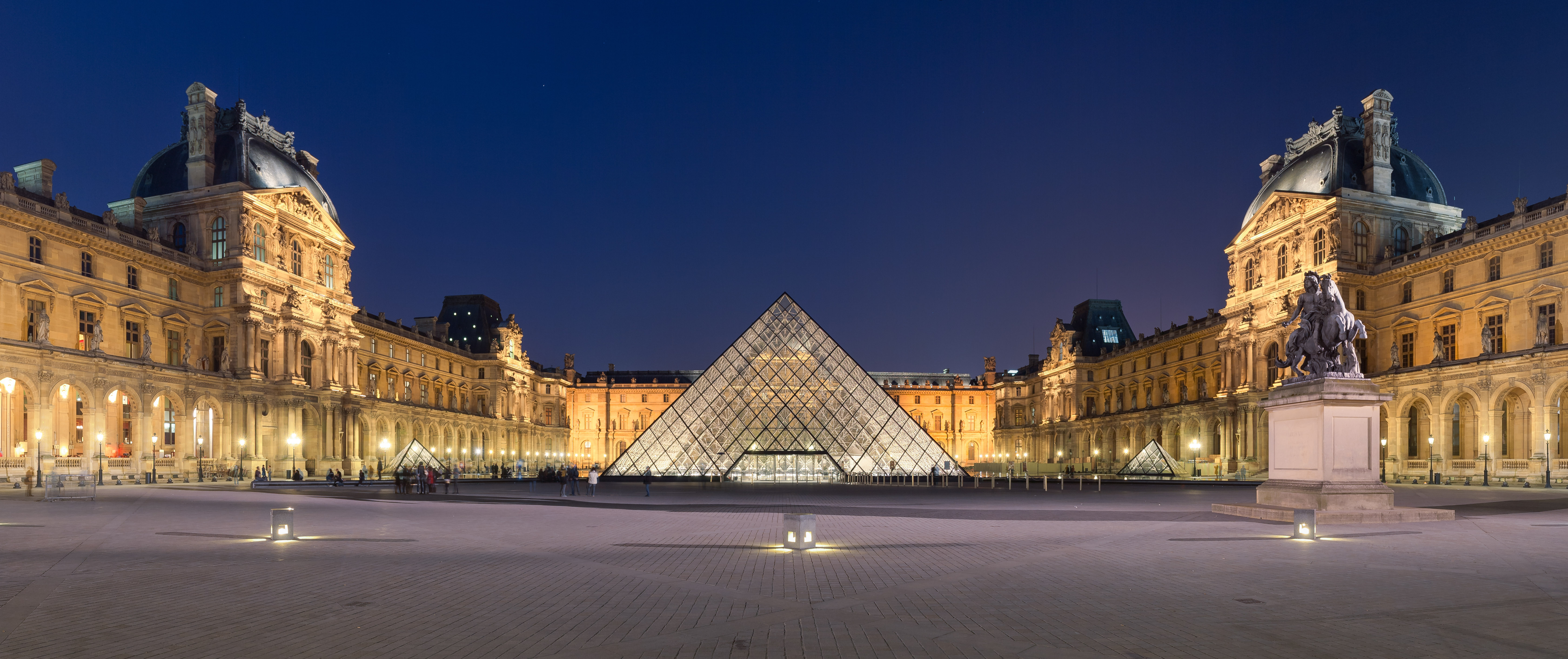
Louvre Museum, France

- List of air shows
- List of amusement parks
- List of aquaria by country
- List of beaches
- List of botanical gardens
- Lists of buildings and structures
- List of casino hotels
- List of casinos
- List of castles
- List of canyons
- List of concert halls
- List of festivals
- List of forts
- List of gardens
- List of heritage railways
- List of islands
- List of libraries
- List of memorials
- List of monuments
- Lists of mountains by region
- List of movie theaters
- List of museums
- List of most-visited art museums
- List of national parks
- List of opera houses
- List of Renaissance fairs
- List of restaurants
- Lists of Roman sites
- List of sculpture parks
- List of shopping malls
- List of show caves
- List of ski areas and resorts
- List of sports facilities
  - List of indoor arenas
  - List of motor racing tracks
  - Lists of stadiums
  - List of tennis venues
  - List of cycling tracks and velodromes
- Lists of theatres
- List of tourist attractions providing reenactment
- List of waterfalls
- List of World Heritage Sites
- List of zoos

=== Tall buildings and structures ===
- List of tallest buildings and structures in the world
- List of tallest buildings in the world
- List of tallest freestanding structures in the world
- List of tallest structures in the world
- List of tallest towers in the world
- Observation decks

== By country ==
=== Australia ===
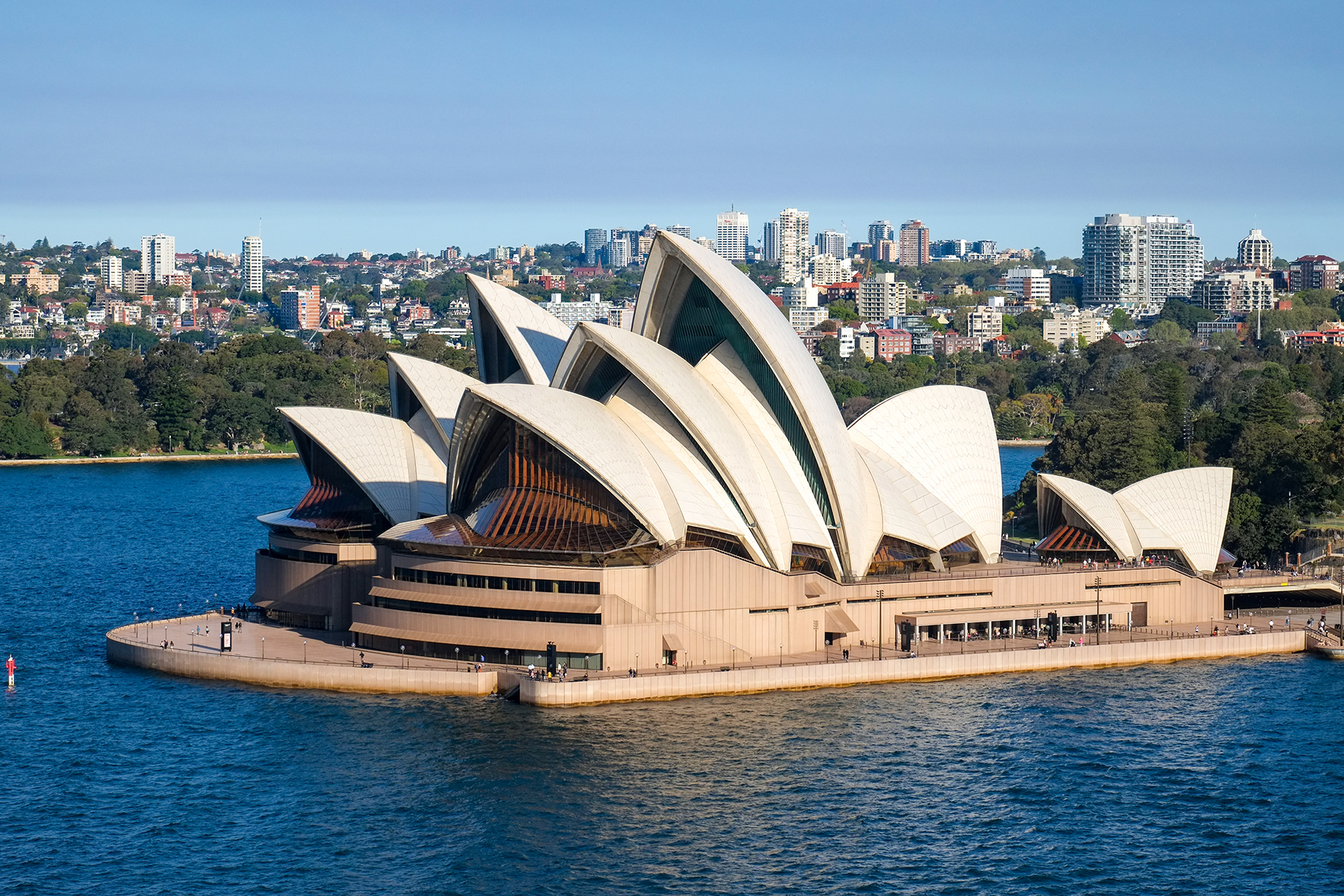
Sydney Opera House, Australia

- List of attractions in Brisbane
- List of attractions in Sydney
- Attractions in Victor Harbor, South Australia

=== Austria ===
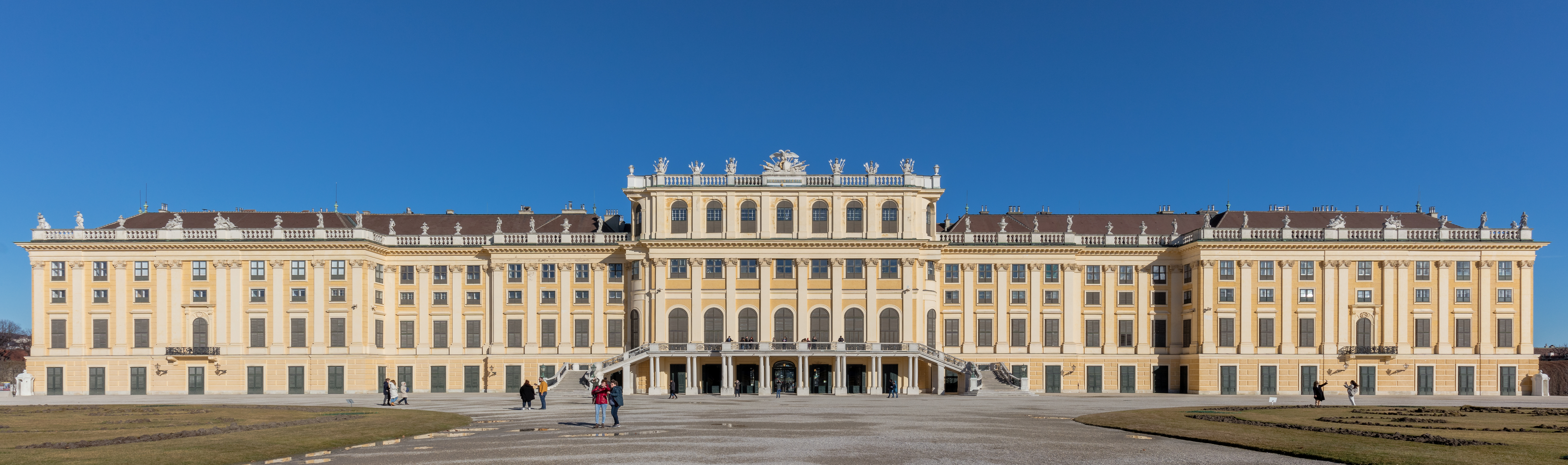
Schönbrunn Palace, the most visited landmark in Austria

- Category: Tourist attractions in Austria
- List of World Heritage Sites in Austria
- Tourist attractions in Vienna

=== Azerbaijan ===
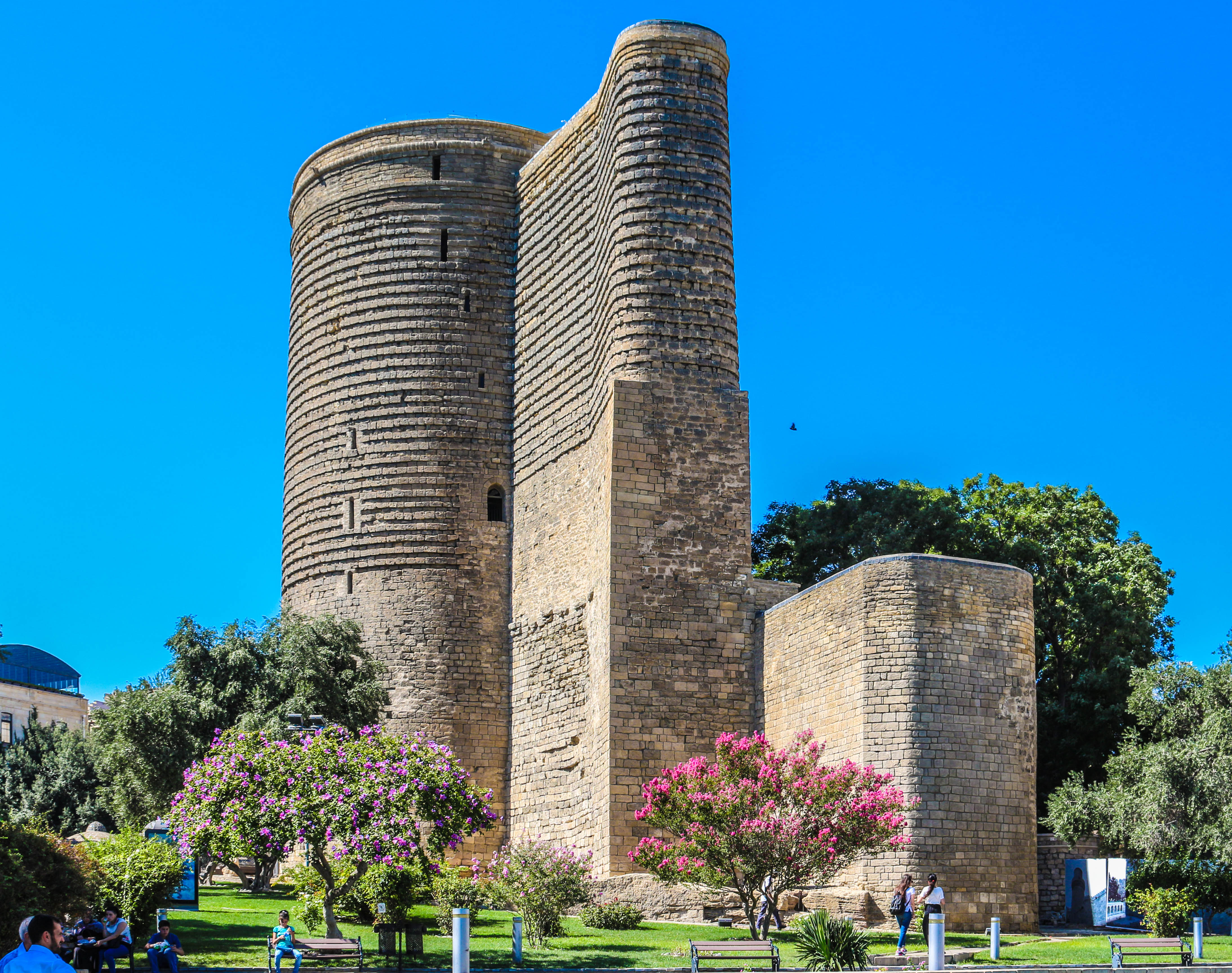
Maiden Tower (Baku), Baku, one of Azerbaijan's most iconic monuments

- Category: Tourist attractions in Azerbaijan
- List of World Heritage Sites in Azerbaijan
- List of tourist attractions in Baku

=== Belgium ===
- Category:Tourist attractions in Belgium
- List of World Heritage Sites in Belgium

=== Botswana ===
- Visitor attractions in Botswana

=== Brazil ===
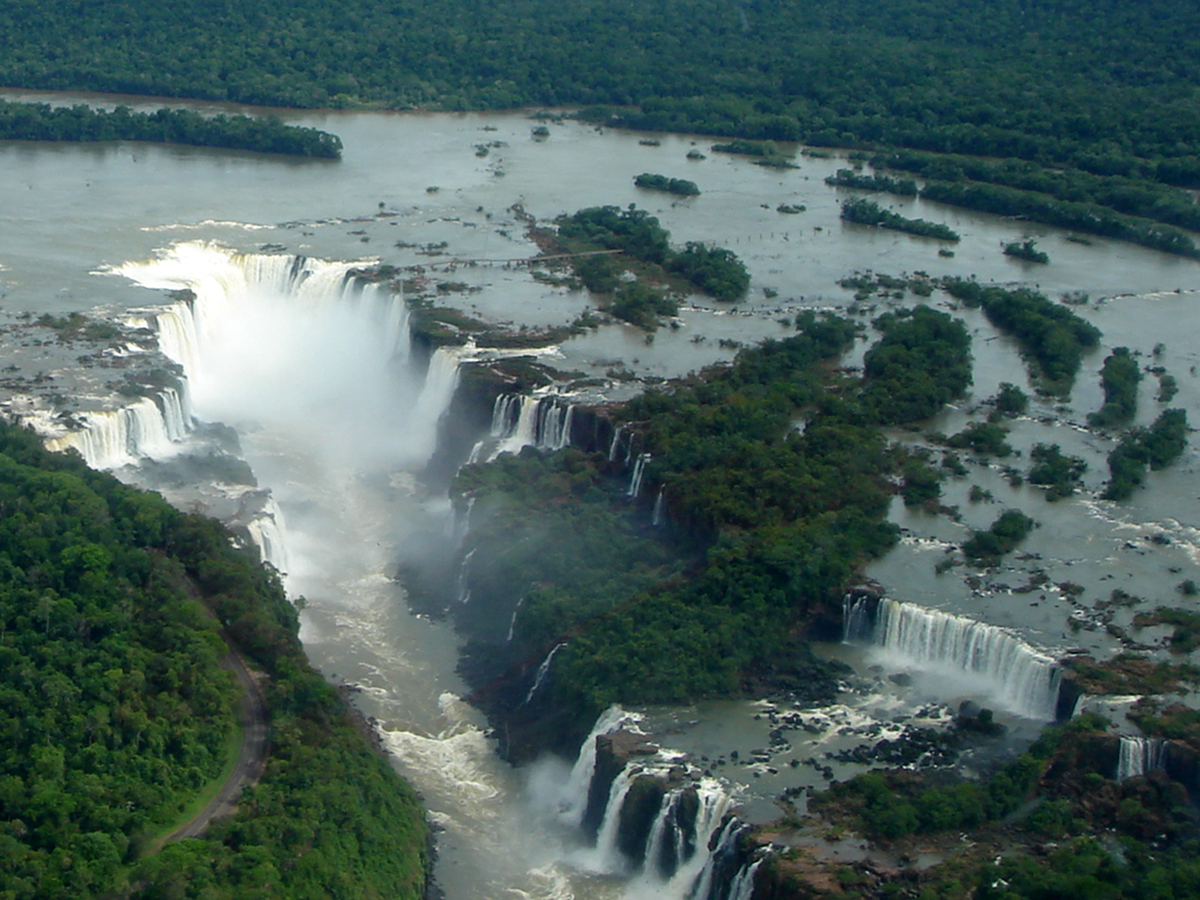
Iguazú Falls, in Brazil, one of the Seven Wonders of Nature

- List of attractions in Brazil

=== Bulgaria ===
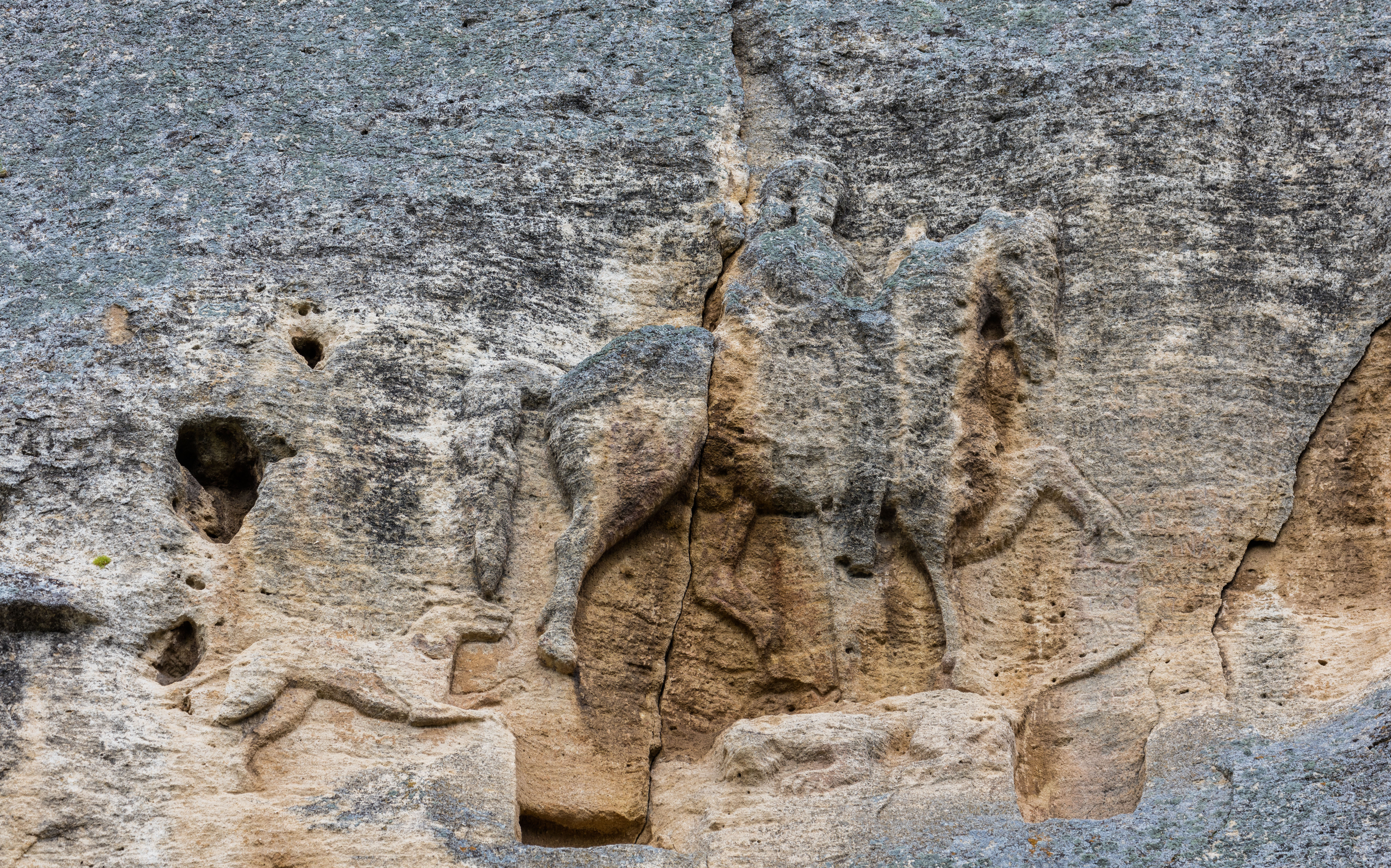
Madara Rider, Bulgaria

=== Cambodia ===
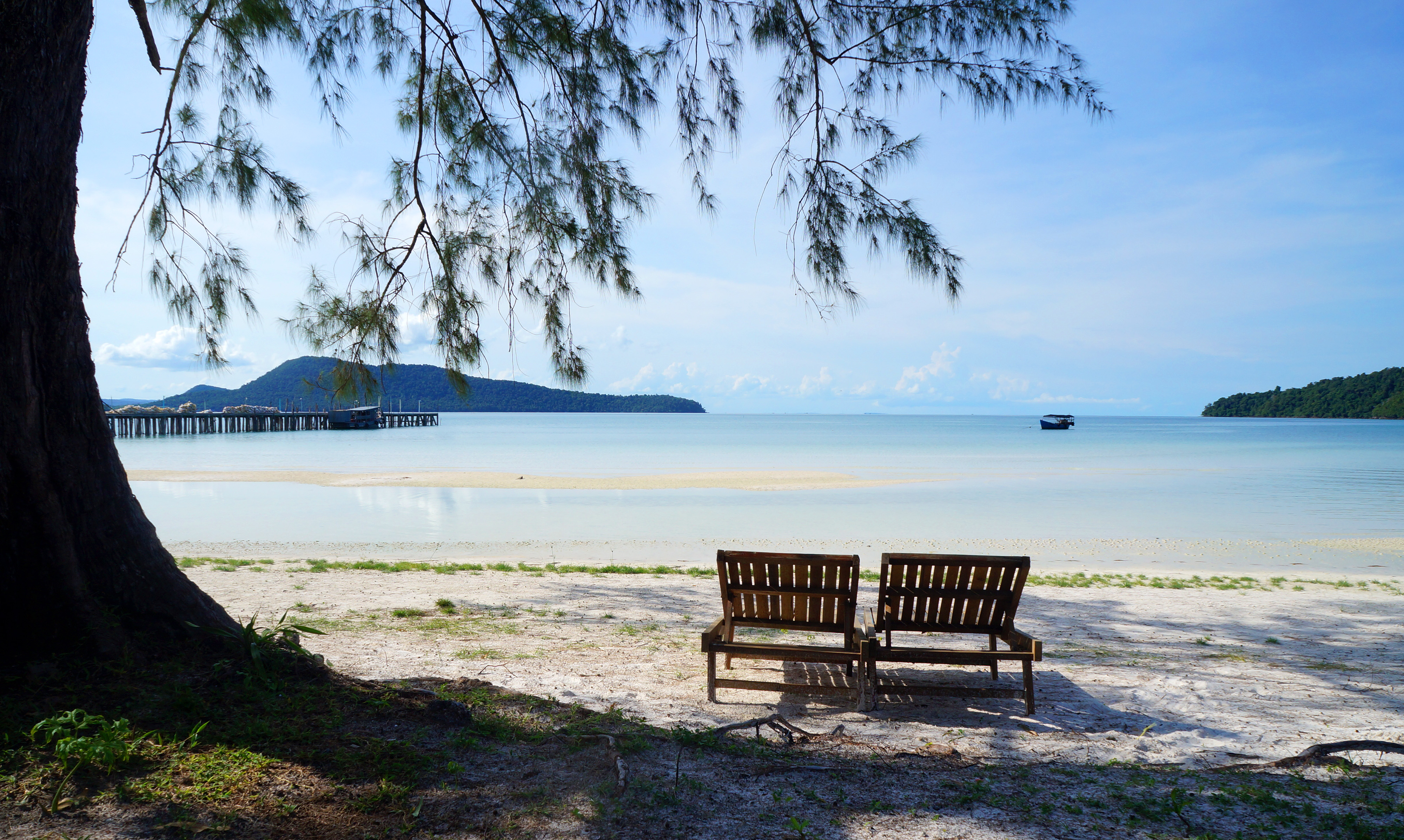
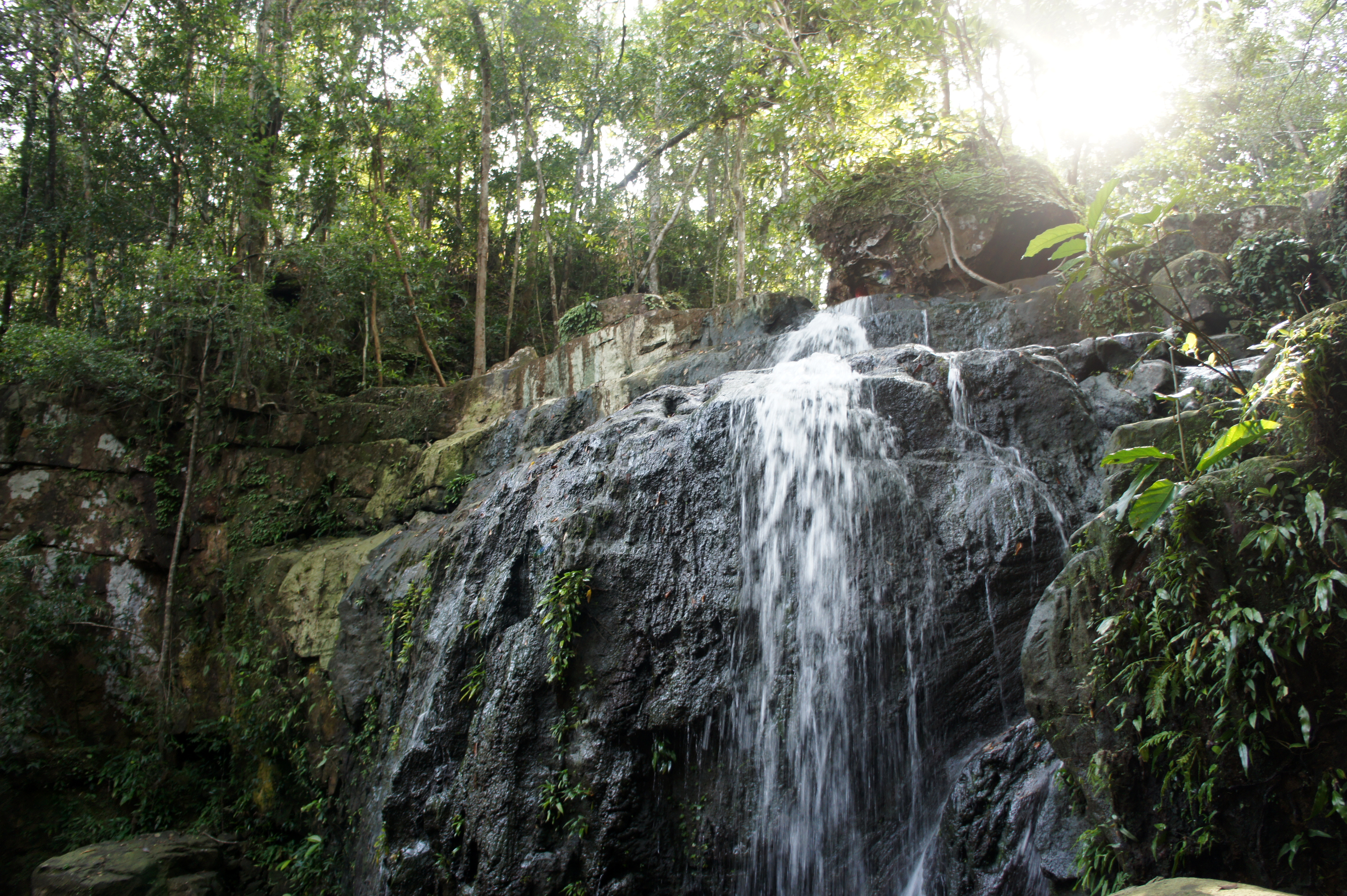
Cambodia: island paradise and Waterfall on Koh Rong

=== Canada ===
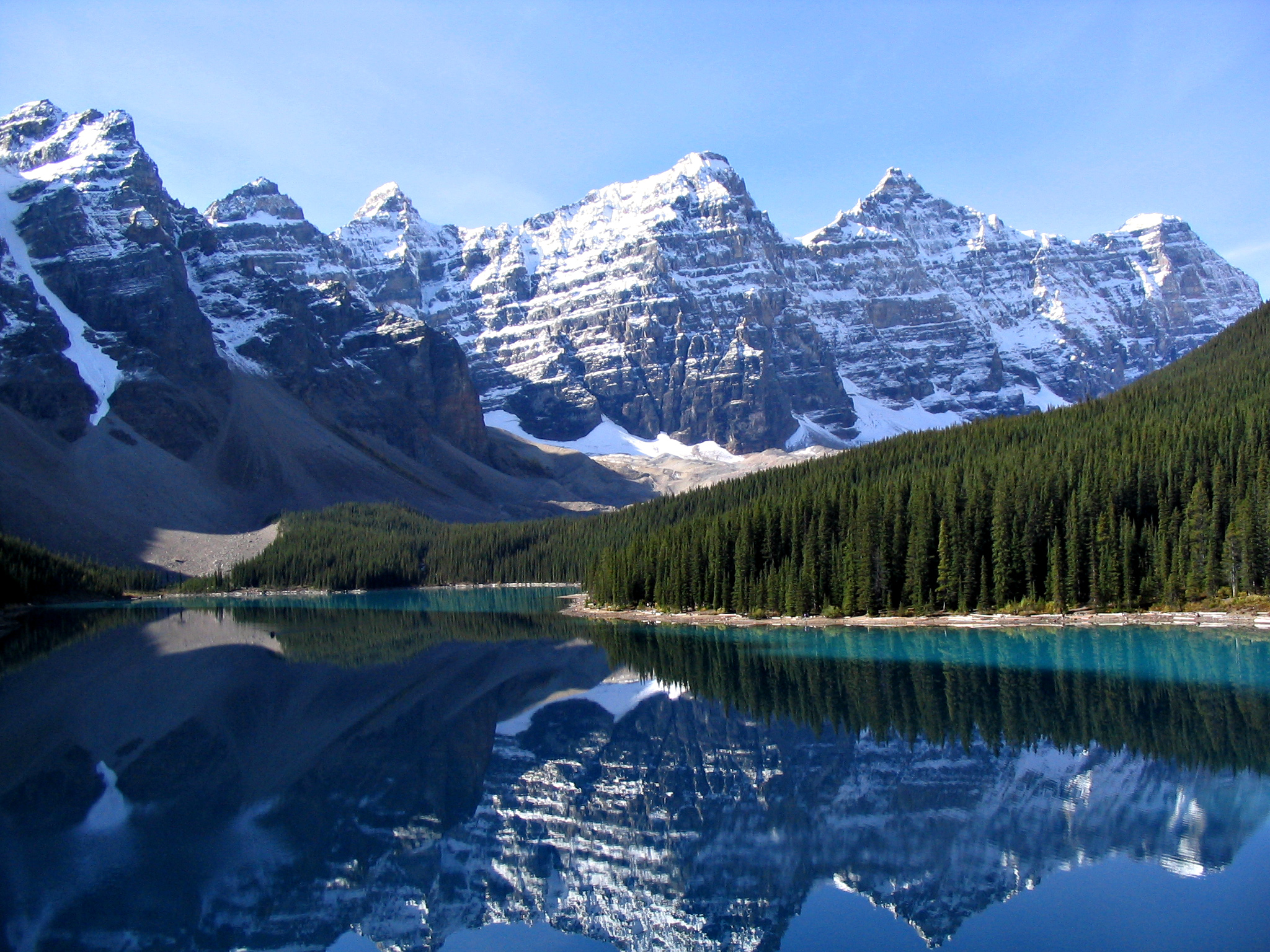
Moraine Lake, Canada

=== China ===
- List of landmarks in Beijing
- List of attractions in Shanghai
- World Heritage Sites in China

=== Colombia ===
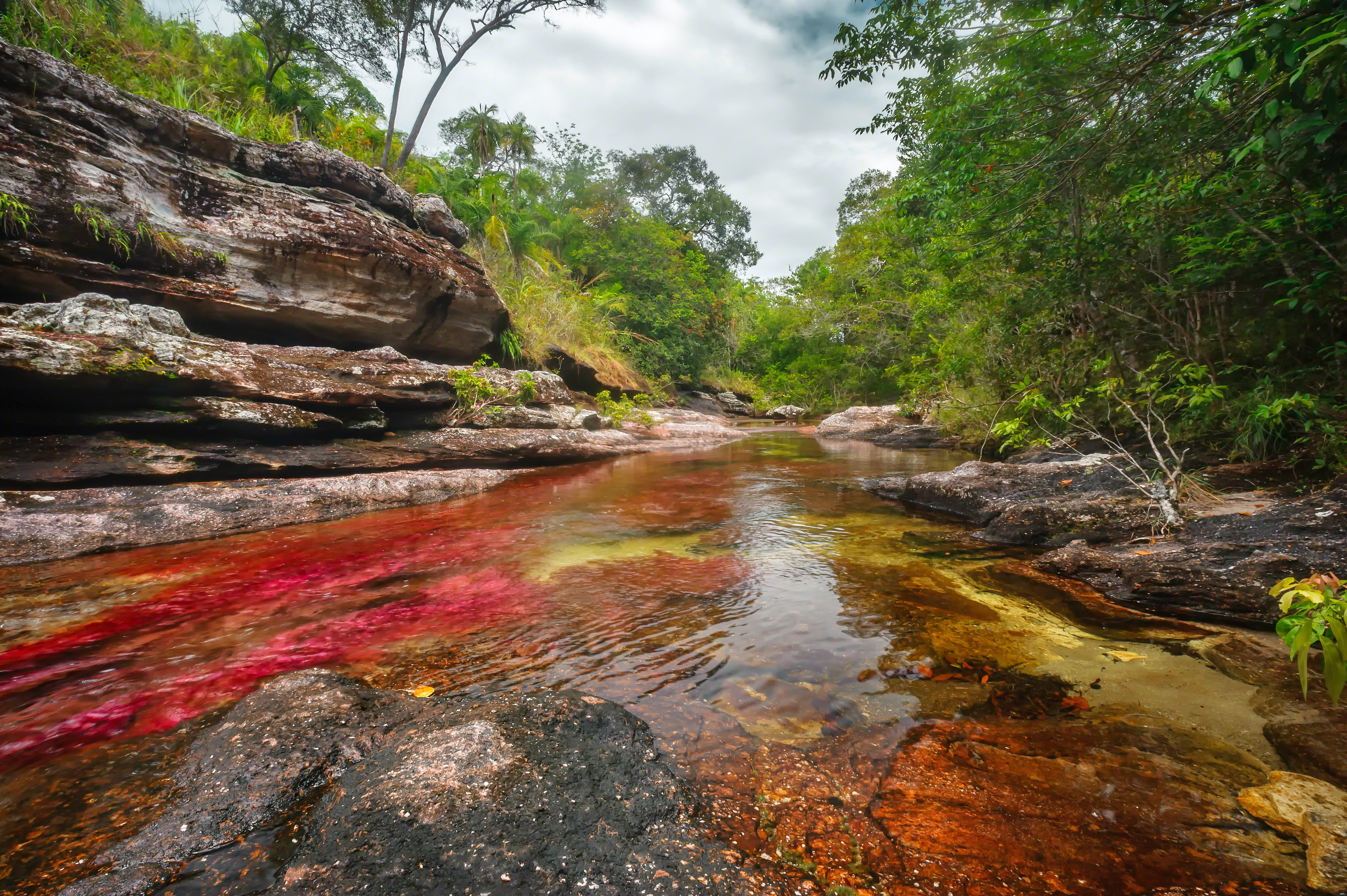
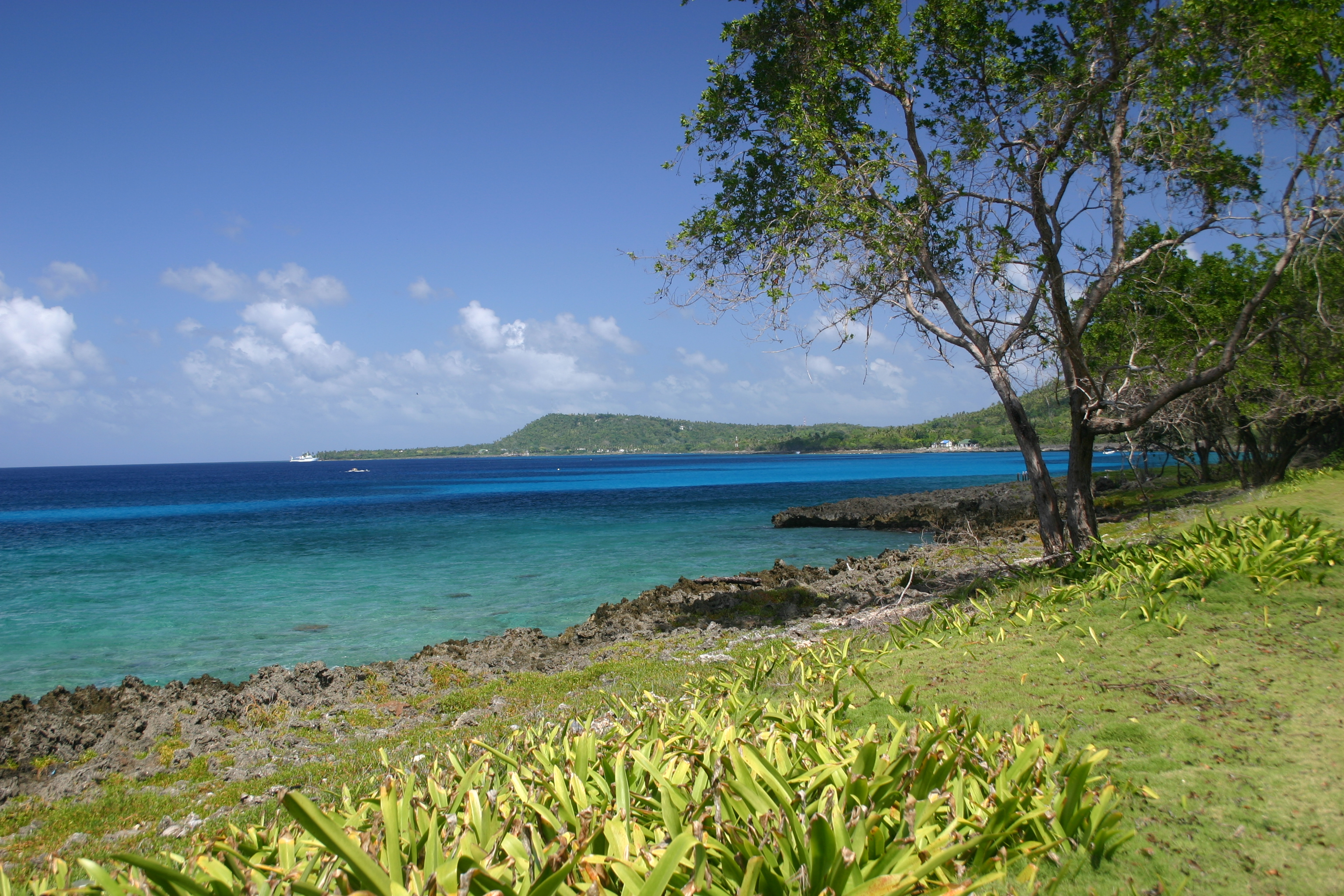
Colombia: Caño cristales, El rio de colores and San Andres Island
- List of national parks of Colombia

=== Denmark ===
- List of tourist attractions in Denmark

=== Egypt ===
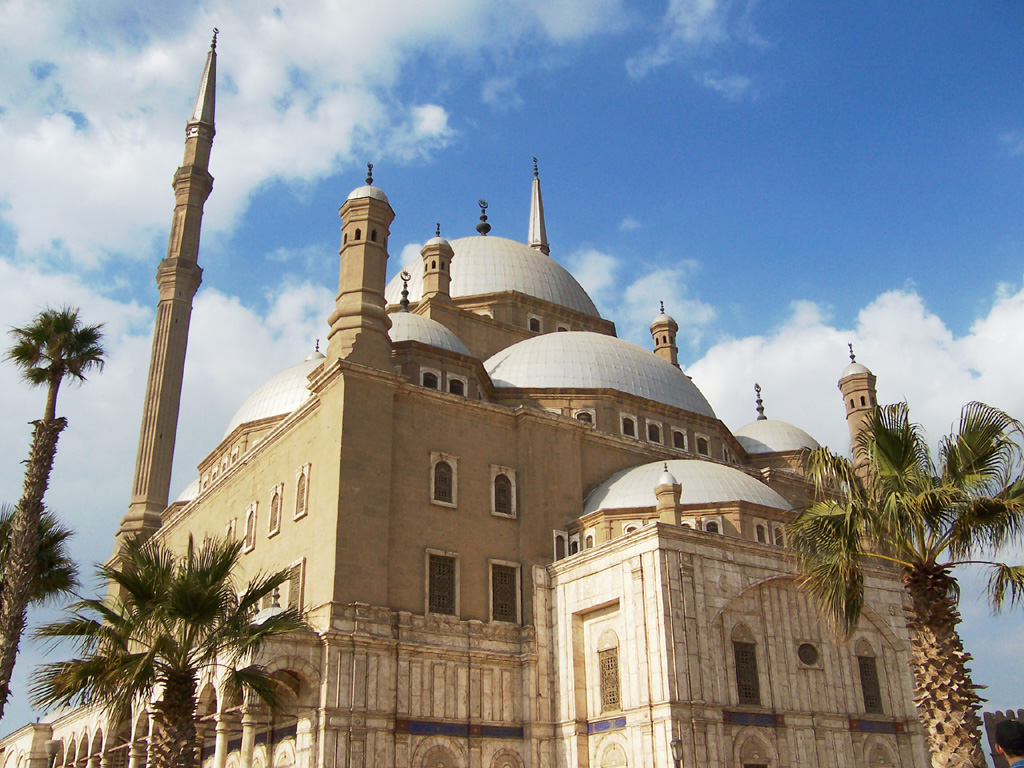
Muhammad Ali Mosque, Egypt

- Tourism in Egypt

=== Ethiopia ===
- List of castles in Ethiopia

=== Finland ===
- List of tourist attractions in Helsinki

=== France ===
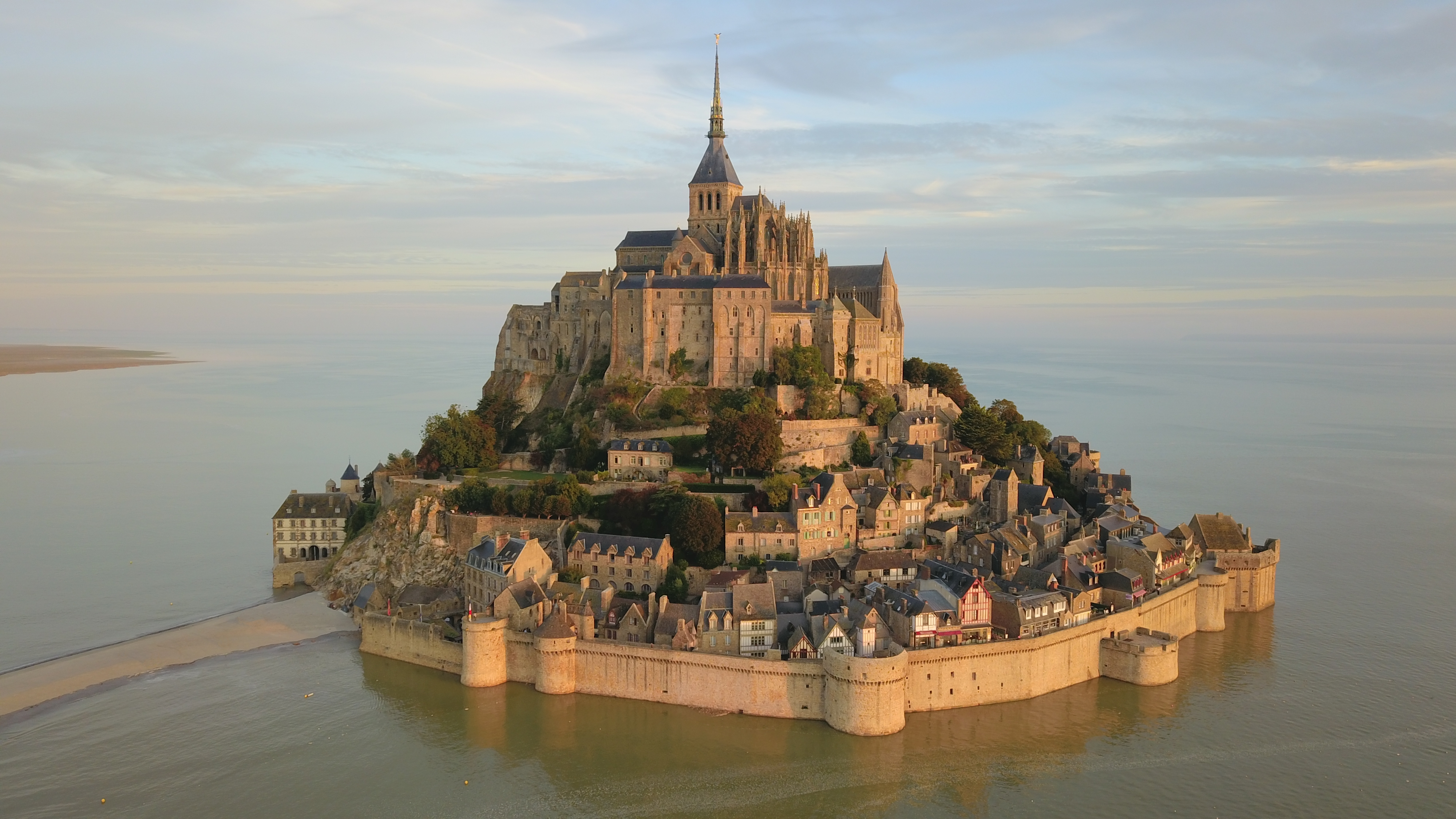
Mont-Saint-Michel, Manche, France

- List of tourist attractions in Paris

=== Germany ===
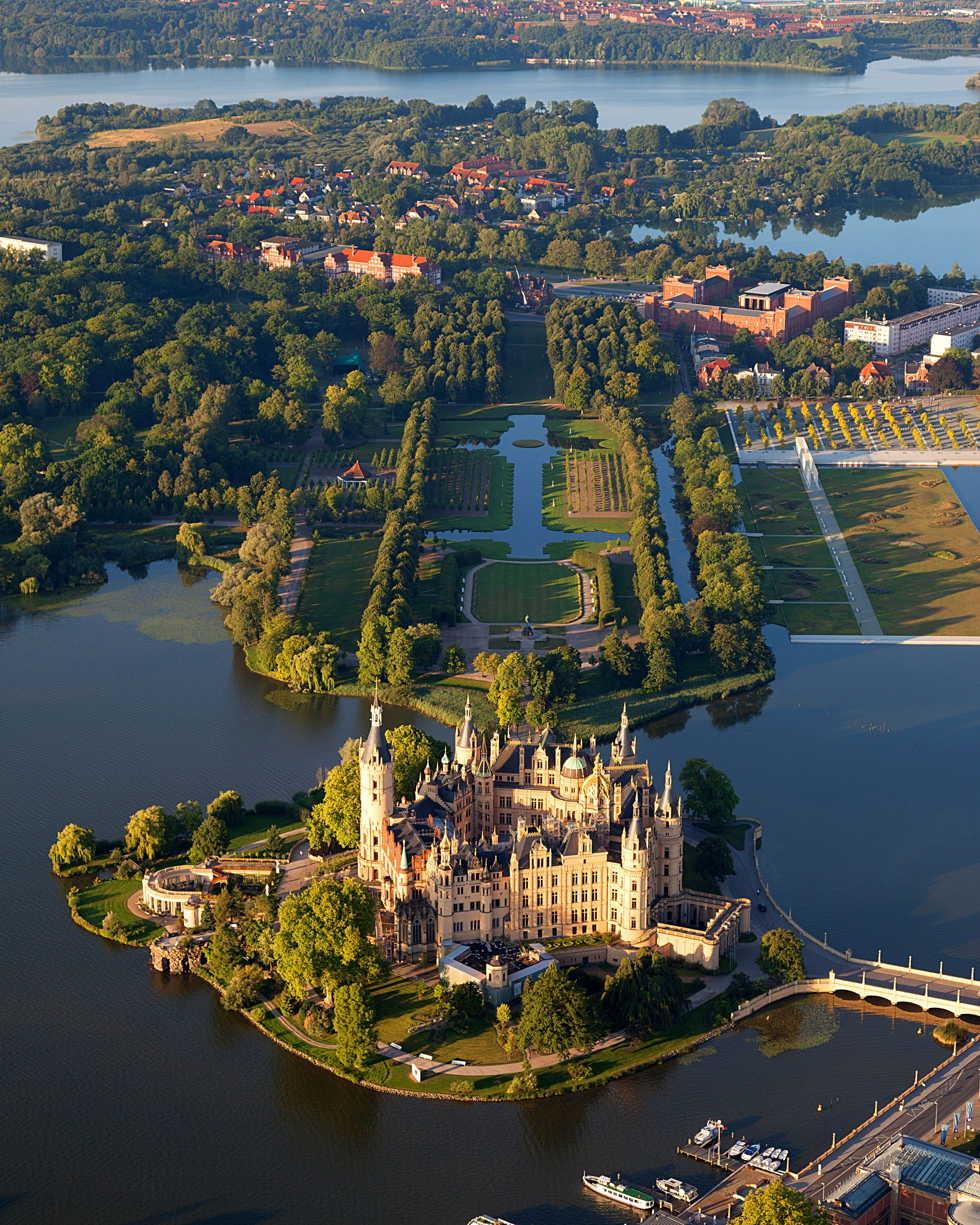
Schwerin Palace, Germany

- List of sights in Berlin
  - List of sights of Potsdam
- List of castles in Germany
- List of cathedrals in Germany
- List of museums in Germany
- List of tallest structures in Germany

=== Greece ===
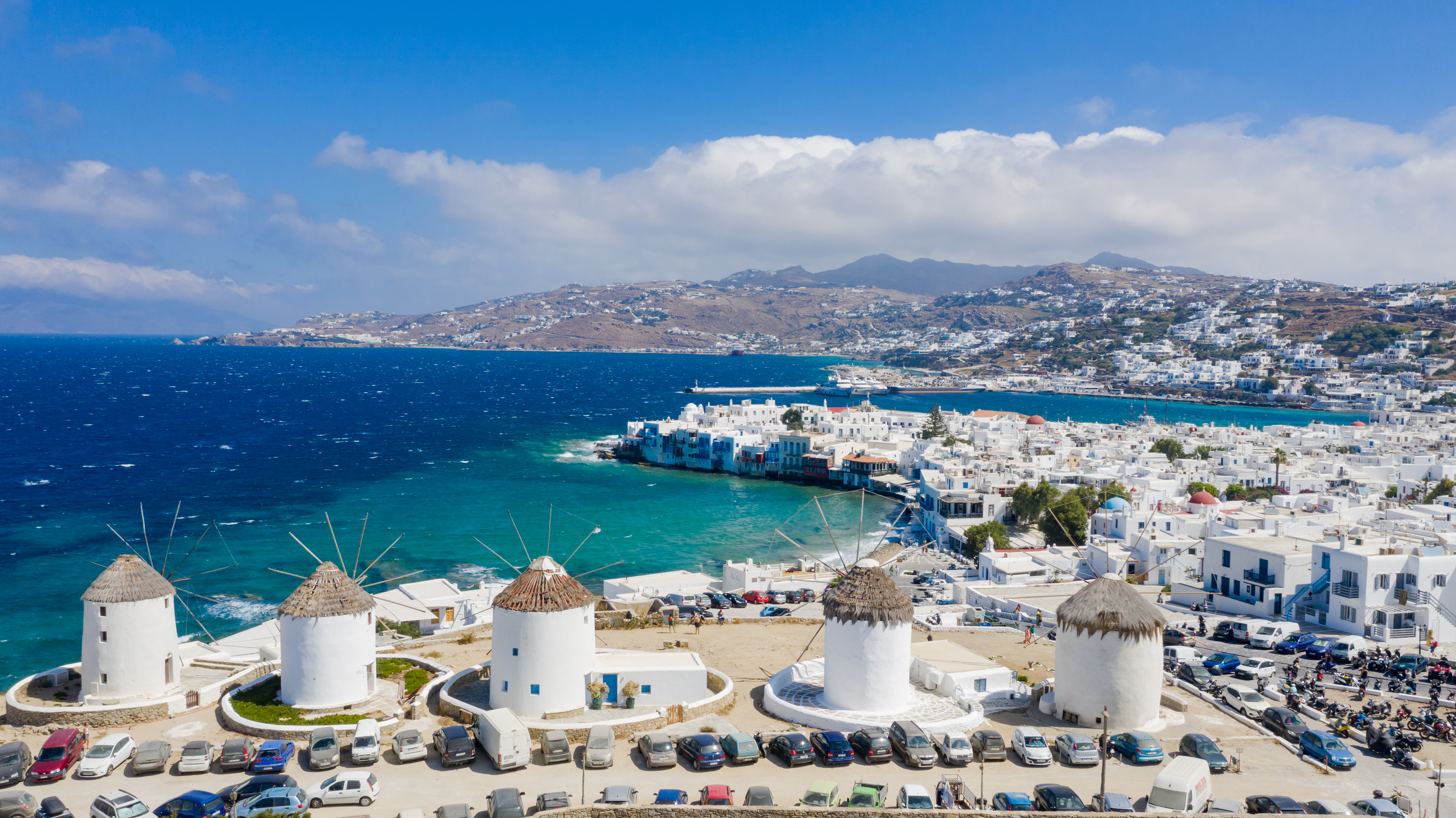
The windmills in Mykonos, Greece

- List of museums in Greece
- List of Archaeological sites in Greece

=== Hong Kong ===
- List of museums in Hong Kong

=== Hungary ===
- List of tourist attractions in Budapest
- List of national parks of Hungary
- List of World Heritage Sites in Hungary

=== India ===
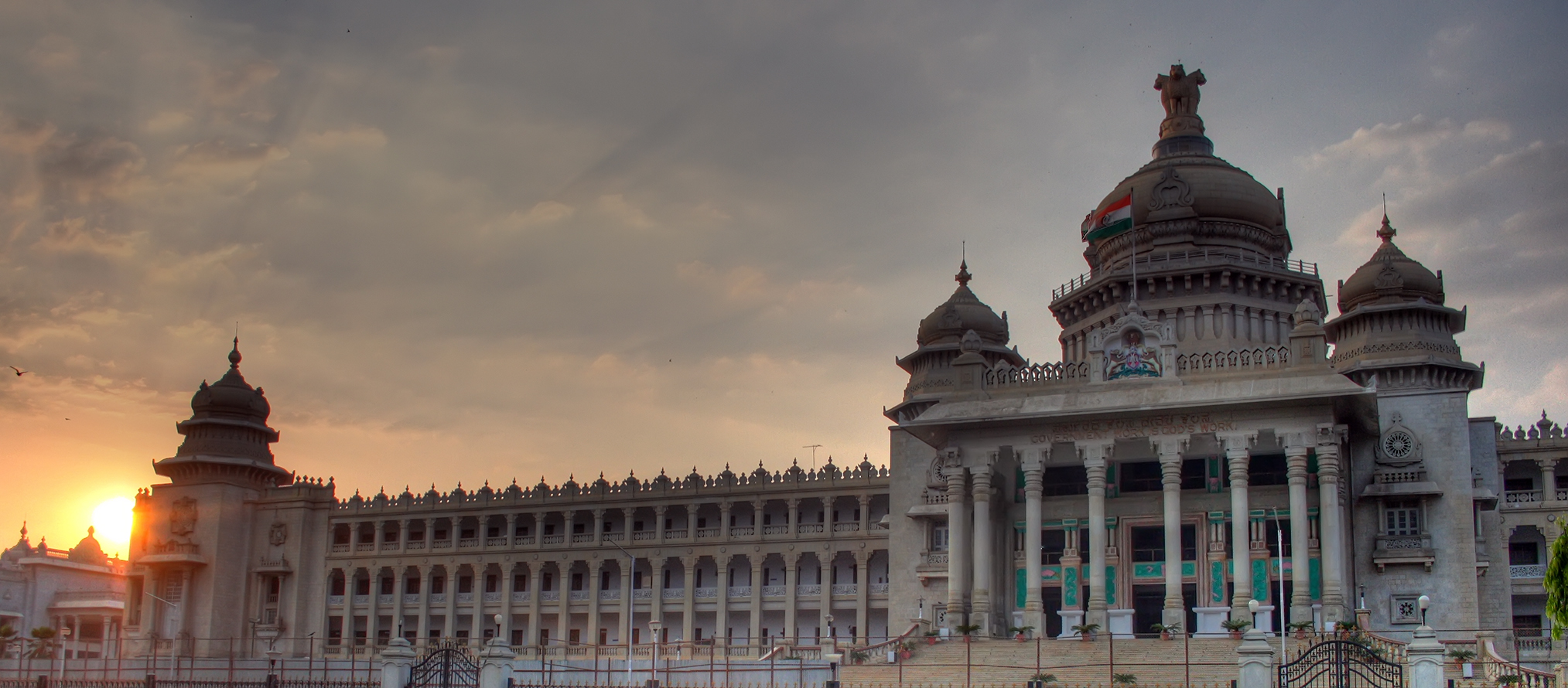
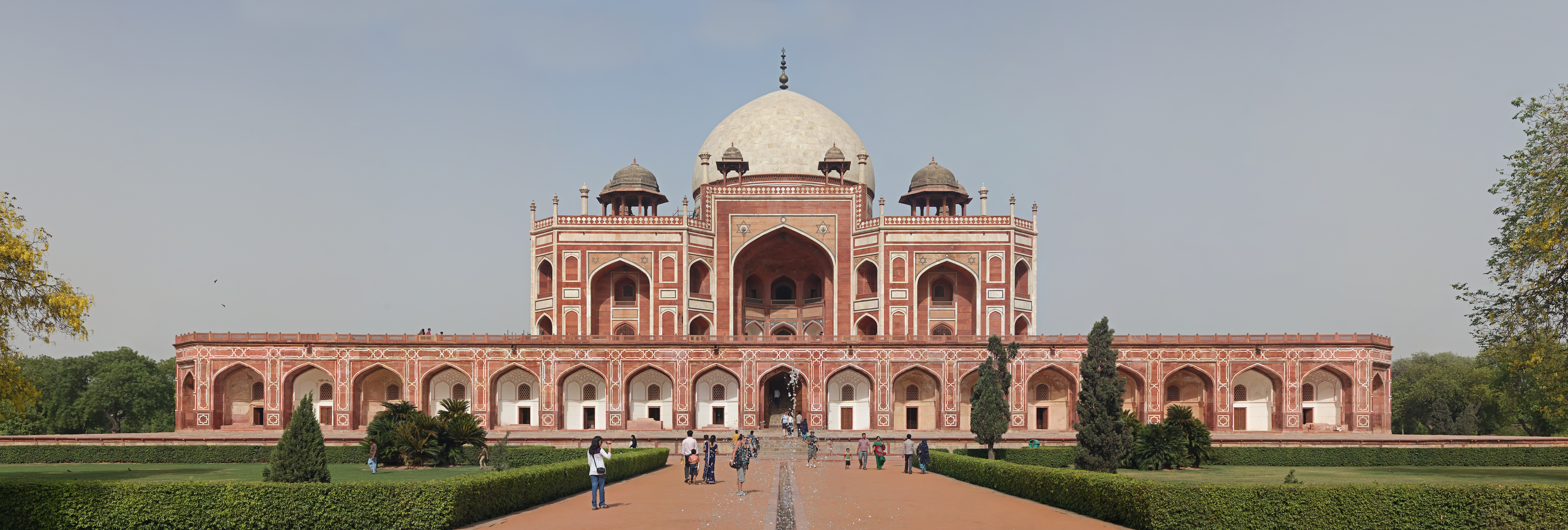
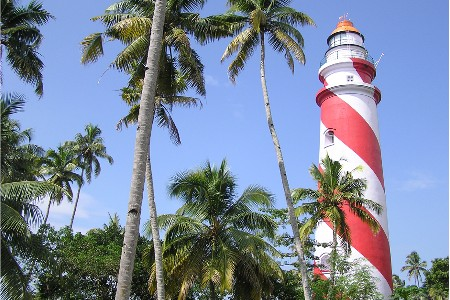
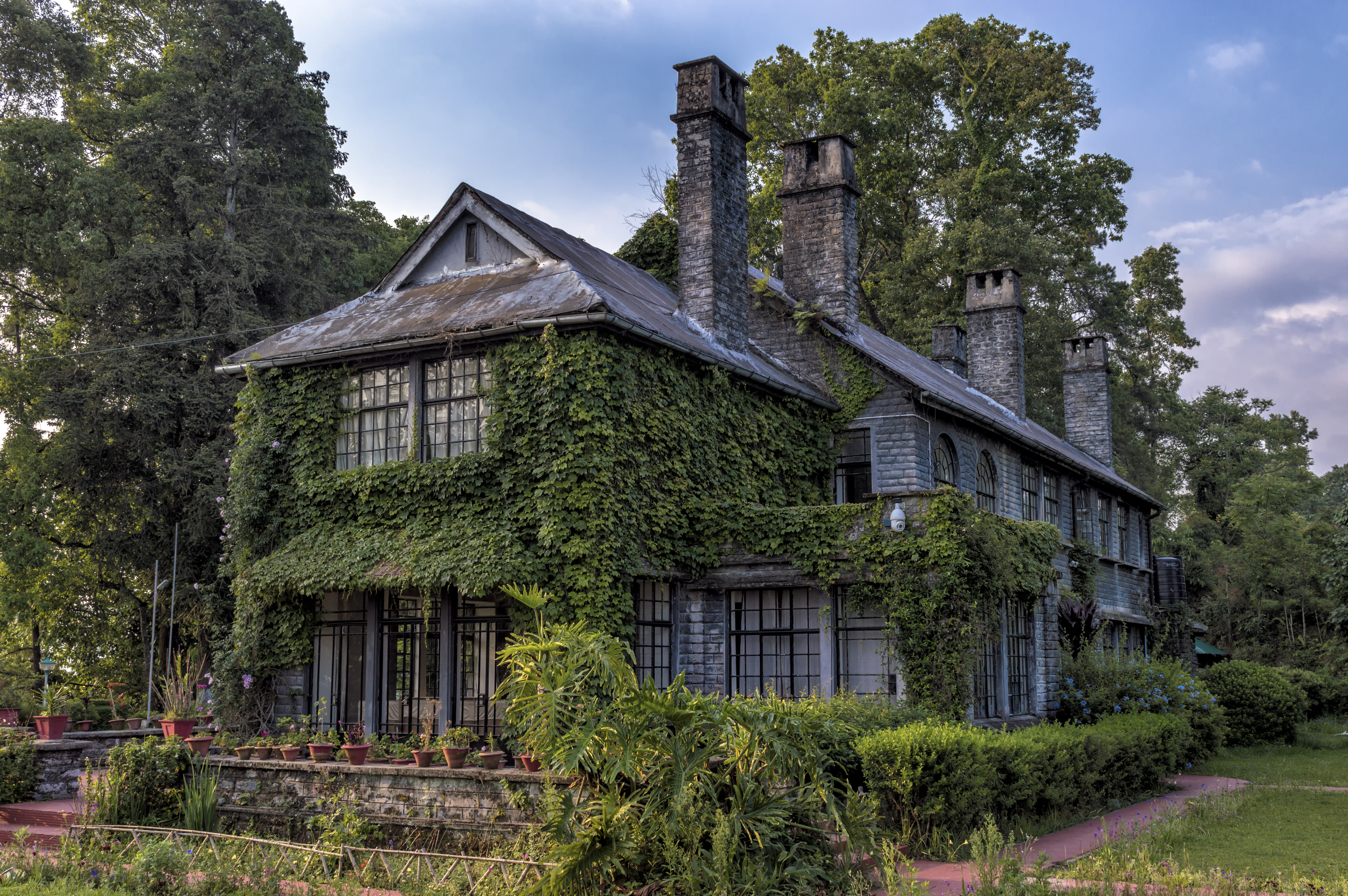
India: Clockwise from top left: Vidhana Soudha in Bengaluru, Tomb of Humayun in Delhi, Morgan House in Kalimpong (a classic example of colonial architecture), and Lighthouse in the Tangasseri.
- Tourism in Tamil Nadu
  - Tourism in Chennai
- List of tourist attractions in Delhi
- Tourism in Telangana
  - List of tourist attractions in Hyderabad
- Tourism in Andhra Pradesh
  - List of tourist attractions and events in Visakhapatnam
  - List of tourist attractions in Vijayawada
- Tourism in Karnataka
  - List of tourist attractions in Bangalore
  - Tourist attractions in Mysore
- Tourism in Madhya Pradesh
- Tourism in Jharkhand
- Tourist attractions in West Bengal
  - Places of interest in Kolkata
- Tourism in Uttarakhand
- Tourism in Kerala
  - Tourism in Thiruvananthapuram
- Tourism in Gujarat
- Tourism in Bihar
- Tourism in Goa
- Tourism in Himachal Pradesh
- Tourism in Jammu and Kashmir
  - Tourism in Ladakh
- Tourism in Haryana
- Tourism in Rajasthan
- Tourism in Uttar Pradesh
  - List of tourist attractions in Allahabad

=== Iran ===
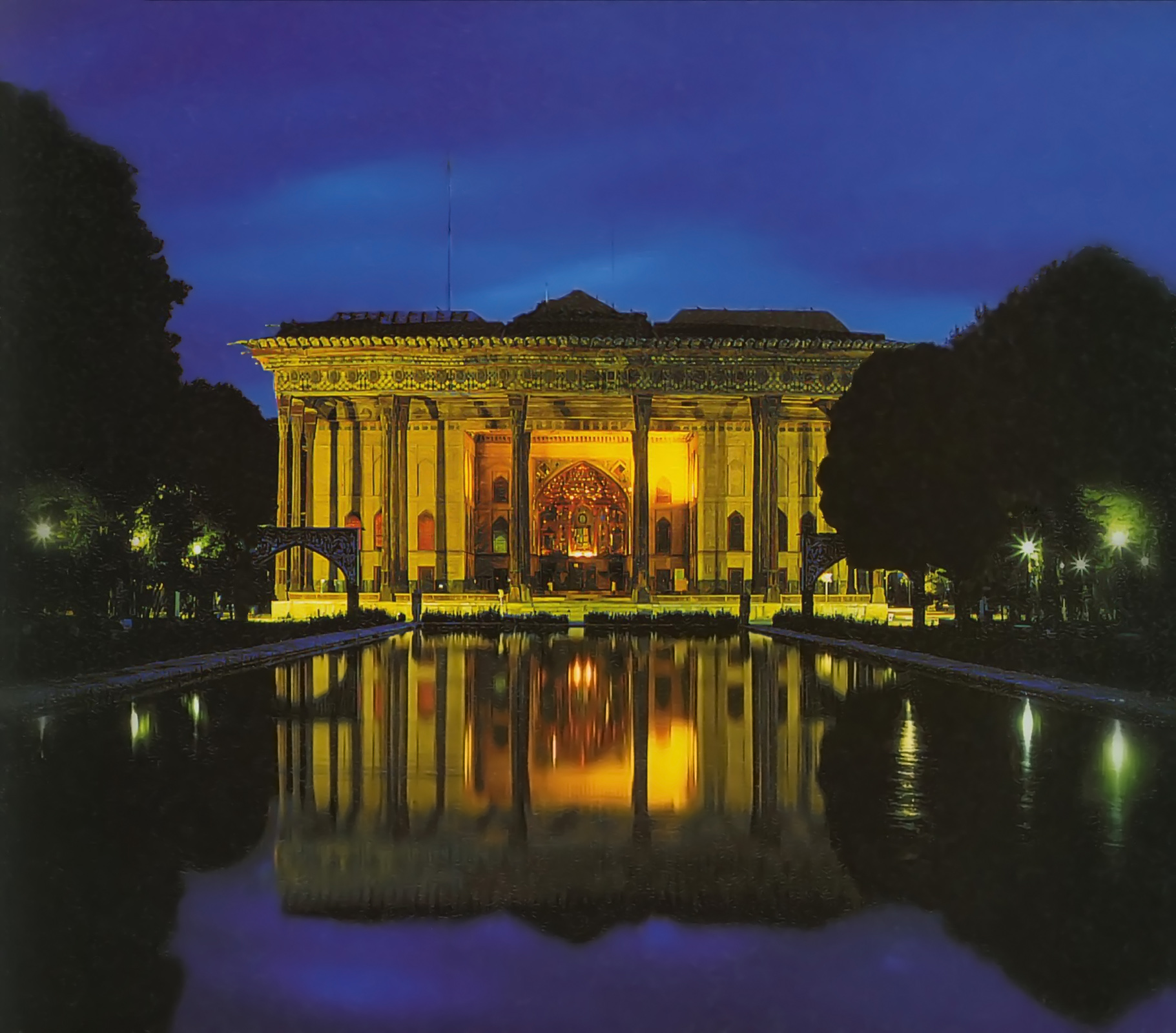
Chehel Sotoon, Iran

- Visitor attractions in Isfahan
- Visitor attractions in Kermanshah
- Visitor attractions in Shiraz
- Visitor attractions of Tabriz
- Visitor attractions in Tehran
- Zagros Paleolithic Museum
- Visitor Attractions of Yazd
- Visitor Attractions of Khuzestan
- Visitor Attractions of Kerman

=== Ireland ===
- List of tourist attractions in Ireland

=== Israel ===
- List of Israeli museums
- National parks and nature reserves of Israel

=== Italy ===
Gondola on the Grand Canal, Venice, Italy

- List of tourist attractions in Rome
- List of tourist attractions in Sardinia

=== Jamaica ===
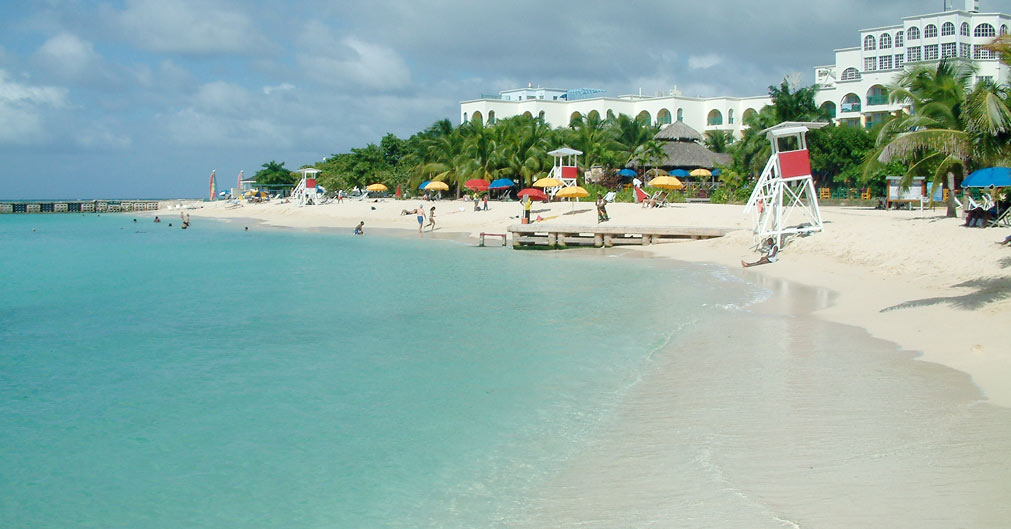
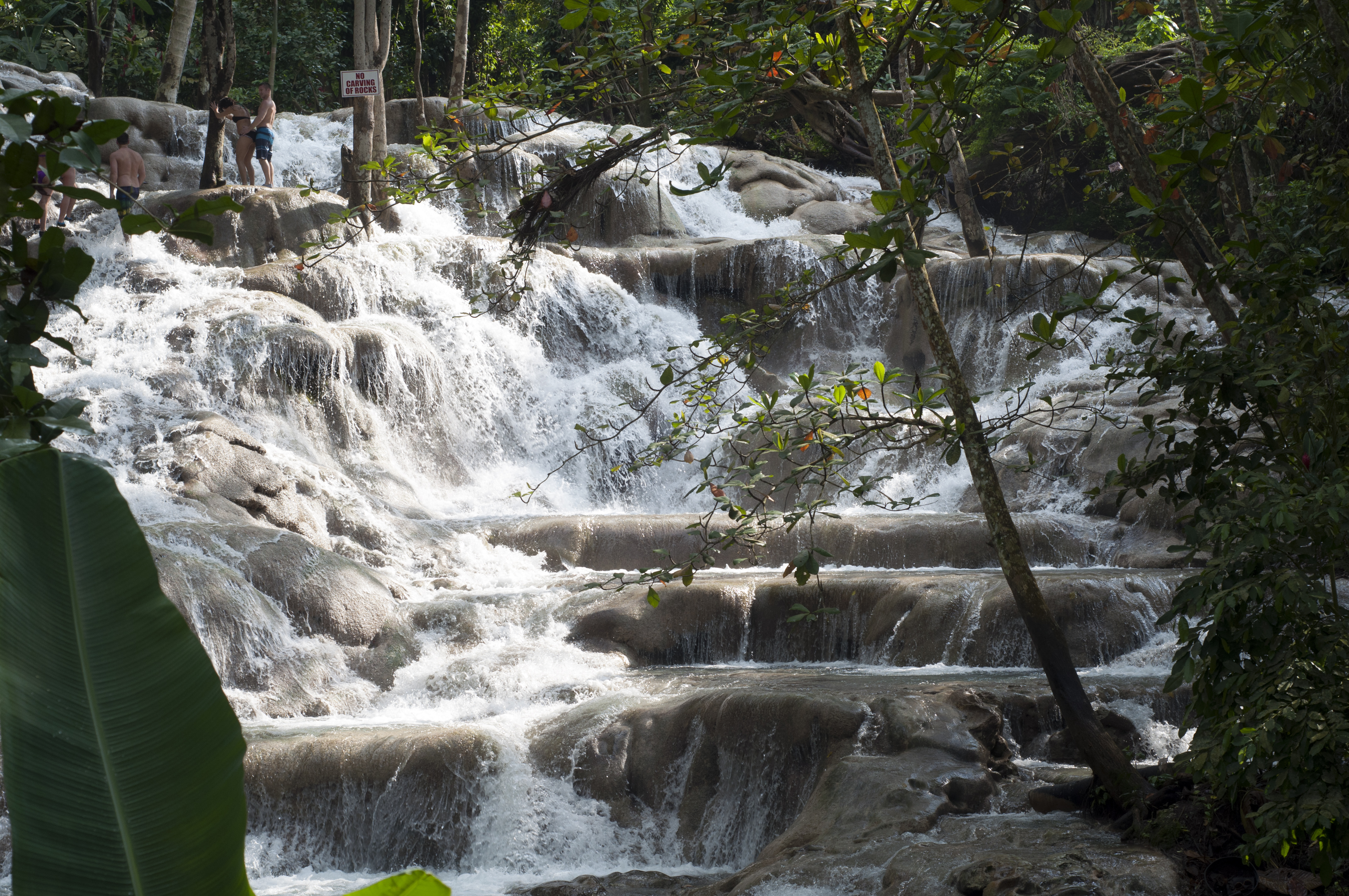
Jamaica: Doctor's Cave Beach, Montego Bay, and Dunn's River Falls
- List of beaches in Jamaica

=== Japan ===
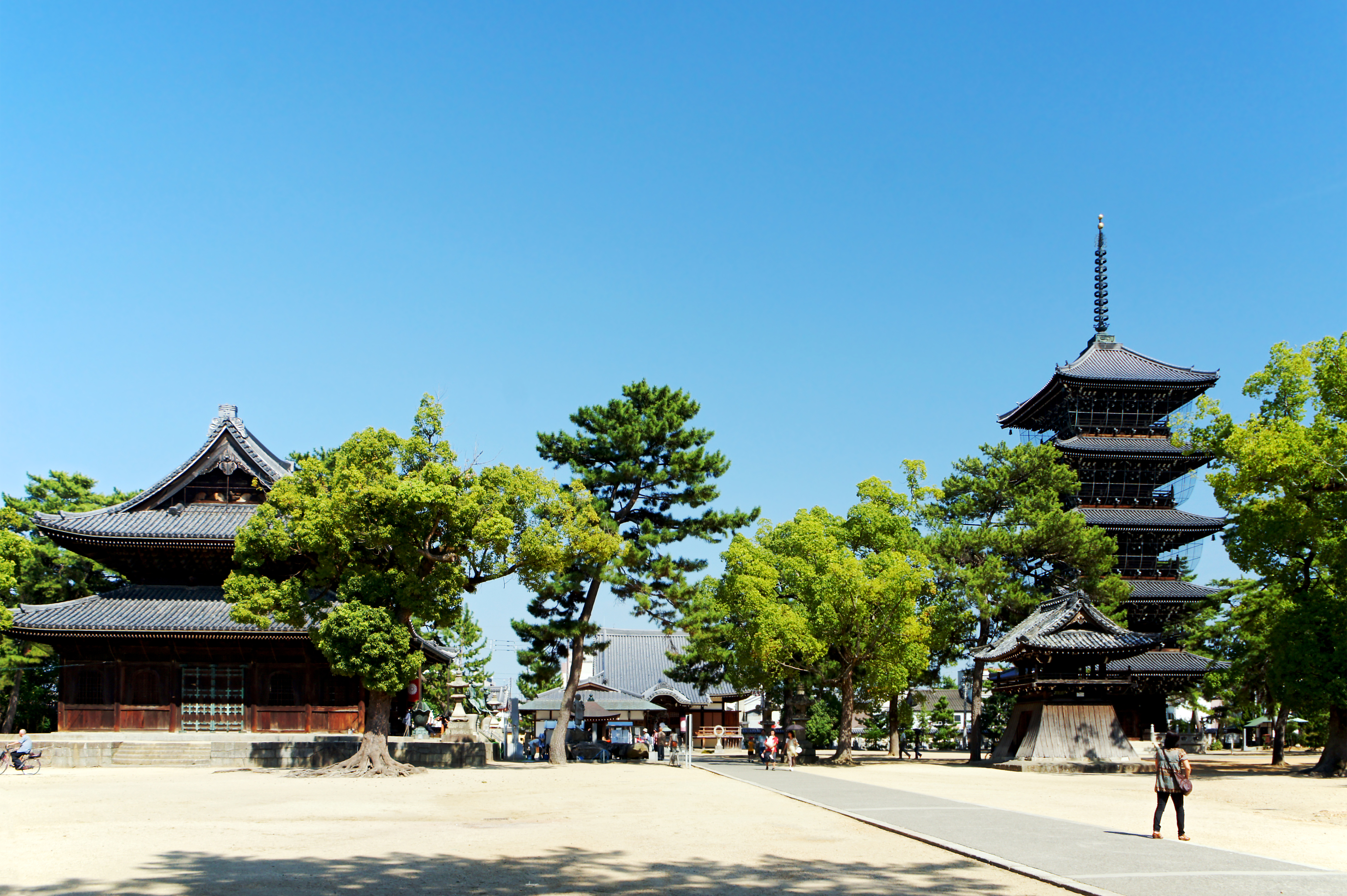
Zentsu-ji temple, Japan

- Groups of Traditional Buildings
- Japanese museums
- Japan's Top 100 Castles
- List of castles in Japan
- List of lakes of Japan
- List of museums in Japan
- List of National Geoparks in Japan
- List of national parks of Japan
- List of Special Places of Scenic Beauty, Special Historic Sites and Special Natural Monuments
- World Heritage Sites in Japan
- National Treasures of Japan
- Three Views of Japan
- Tourism in Tokyo

=== Jordan ===
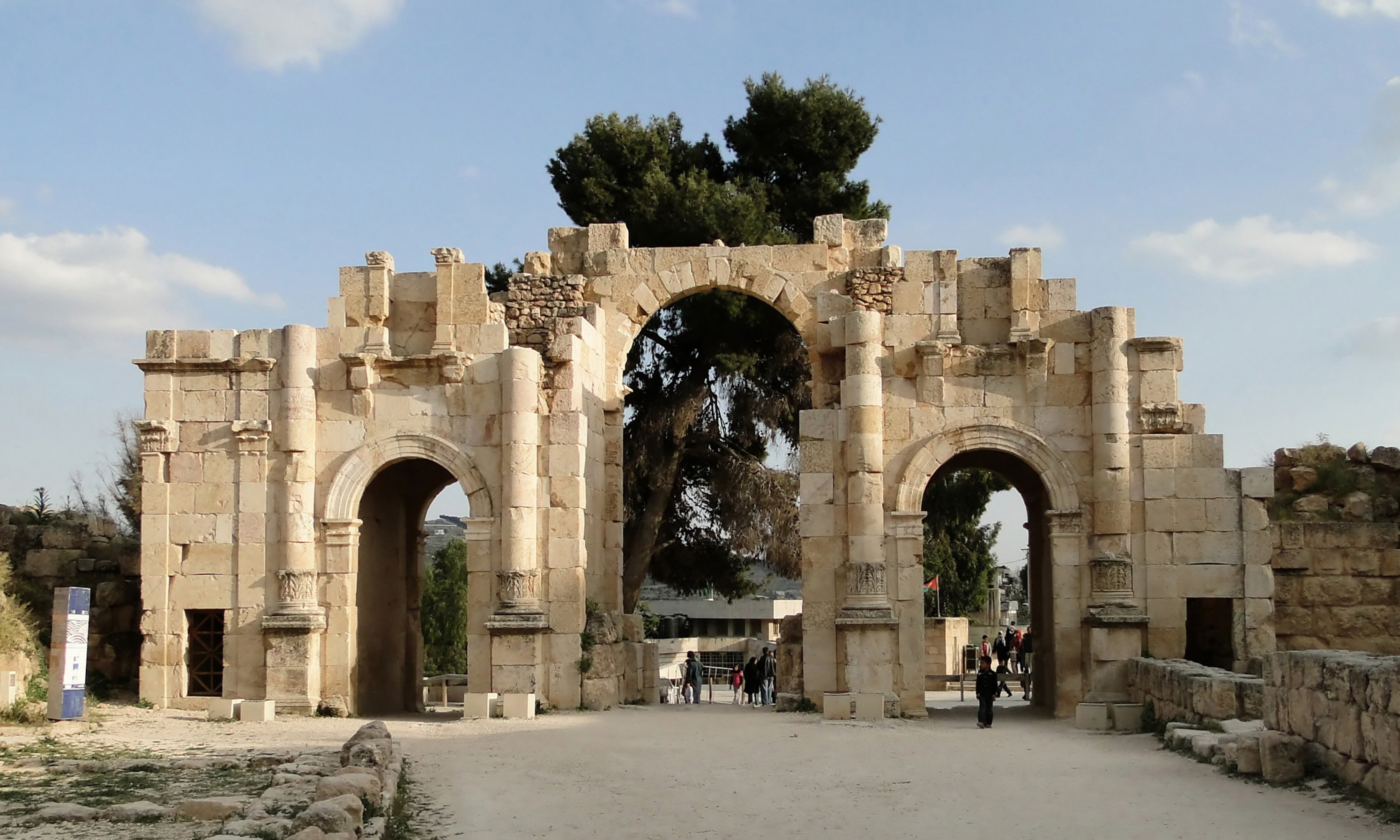
South Gate in Jerash, Jordan

=== Kuwait ===
- Tourism in Kuwait

=== Lebanon ===
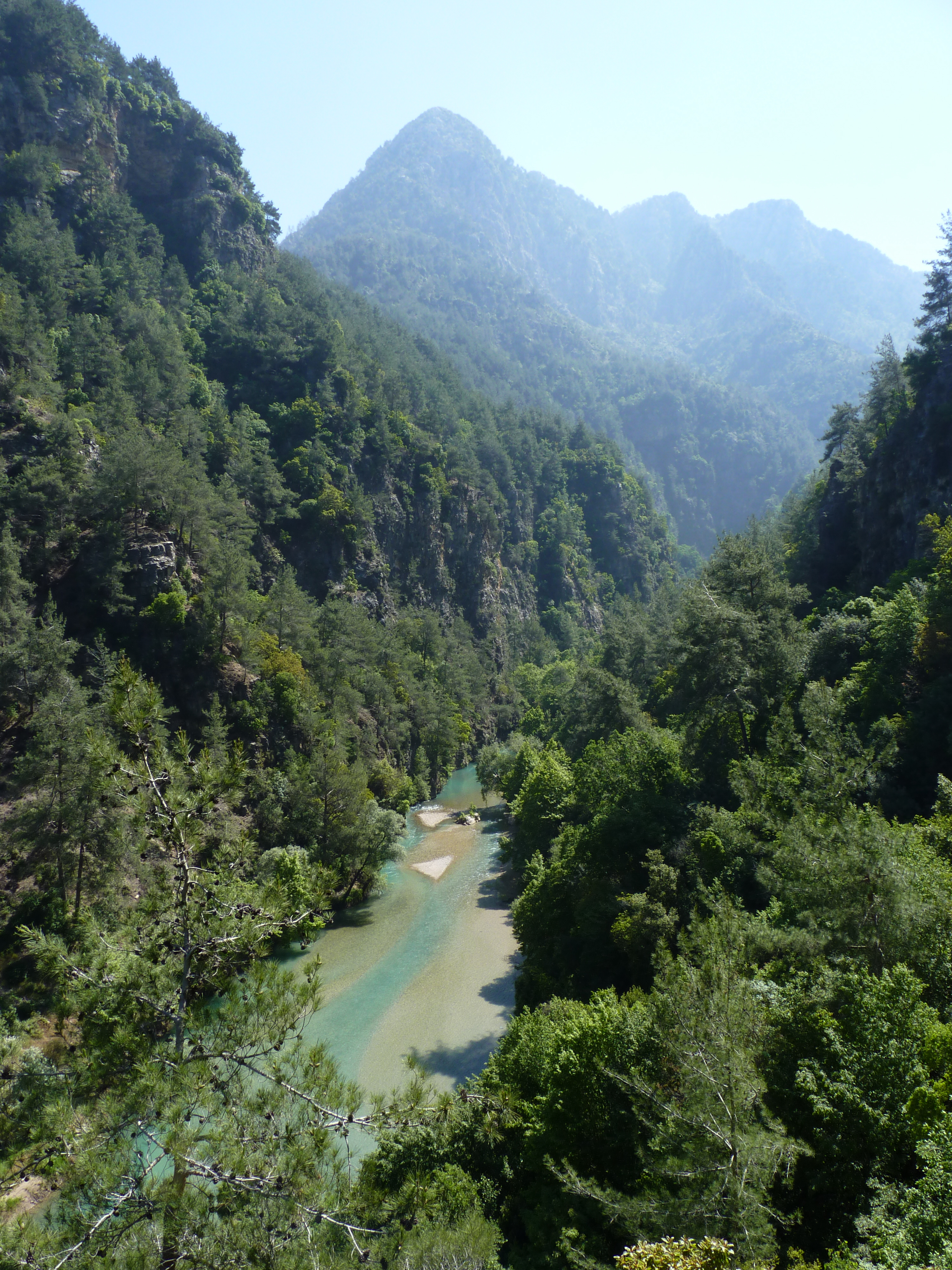
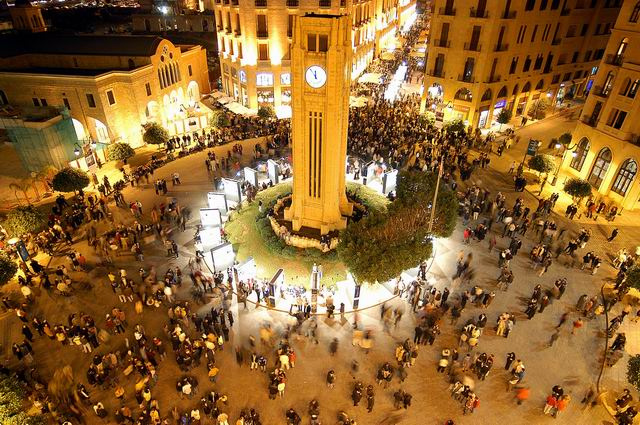
Lebanon: Nahr Ibrahim river, and Beirut Central District

=== Macau ===
- List of museums in Macau

=== Madagascar ===
- Tourist attractions in Madagascar

=== Mauritius ===
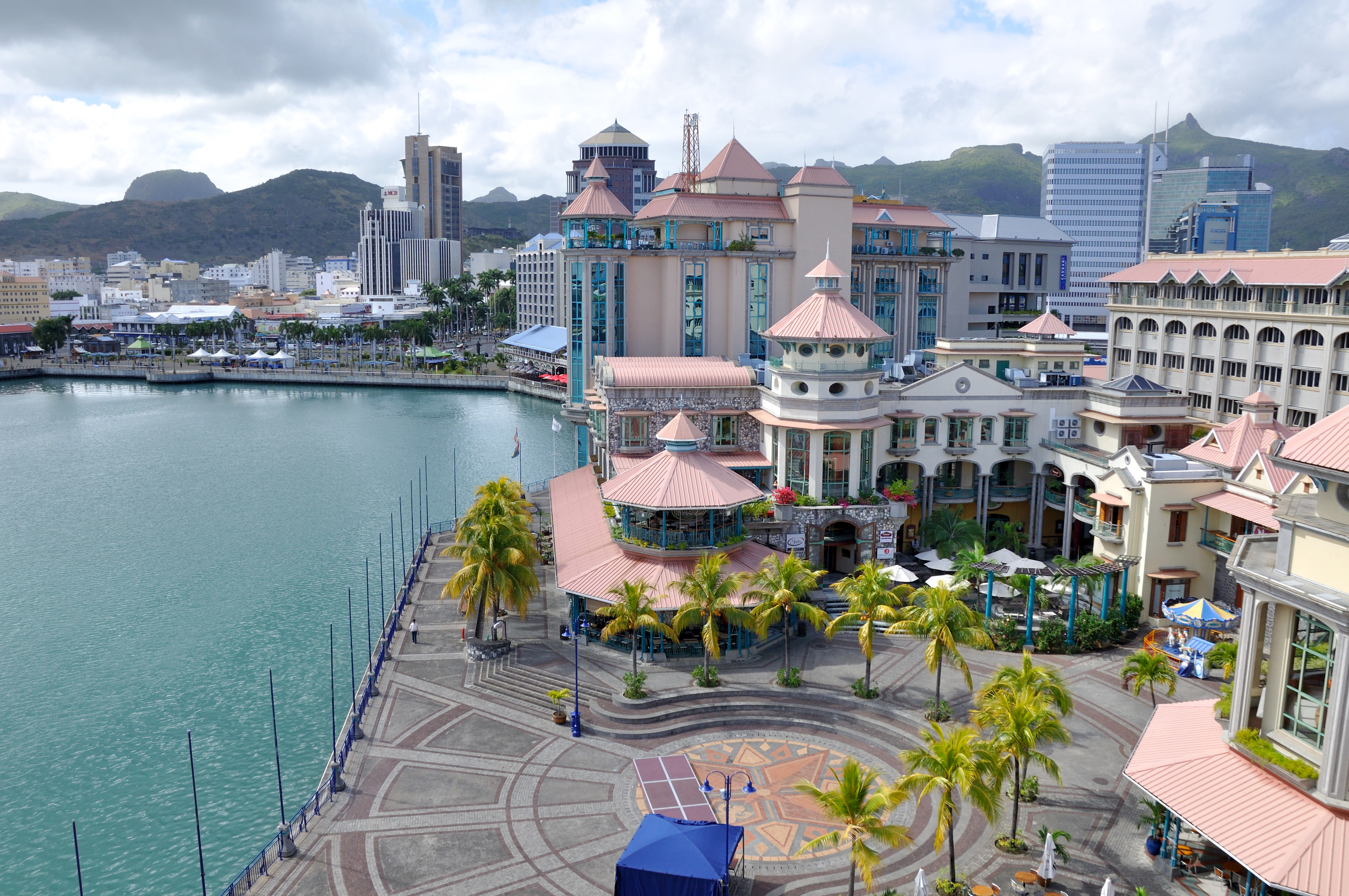
Caudan Waterfront, Port Louis, Mauritius

=== Nepal ===
Nepal is the country where Mount Everest, the highest mountain peak in the world, is located. Mountaineering and other types of adventure tourism and ecotourism are important attractions for visitors. The world heritage site Lumbini, birthplace of Gautama Buddha, is located in southern Nepal, and there are other important religious pilgrimage sites throughout the country.

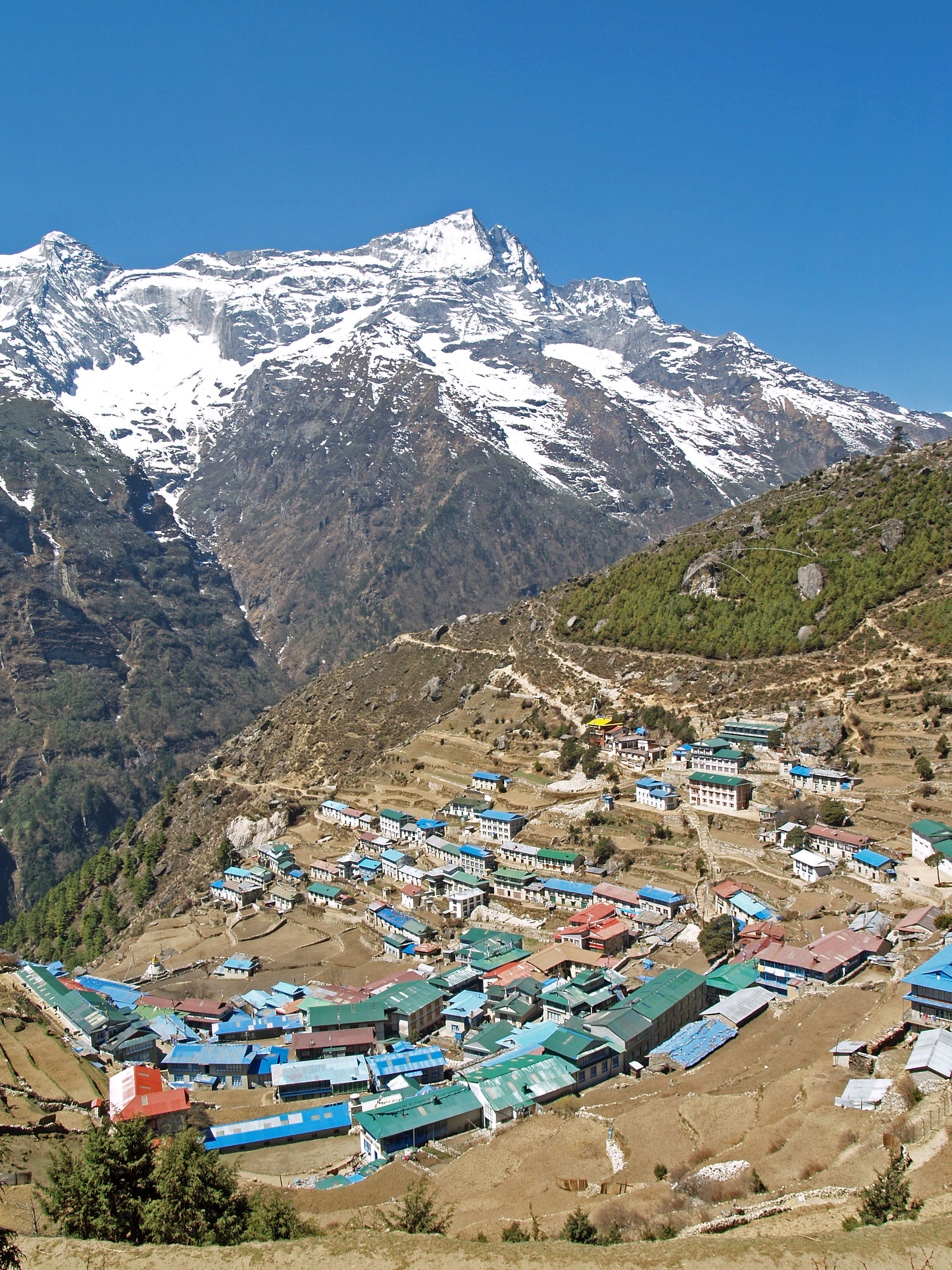
Namche Bazaar, Gateway to Mount Everest under snow

=== Netherlands ===
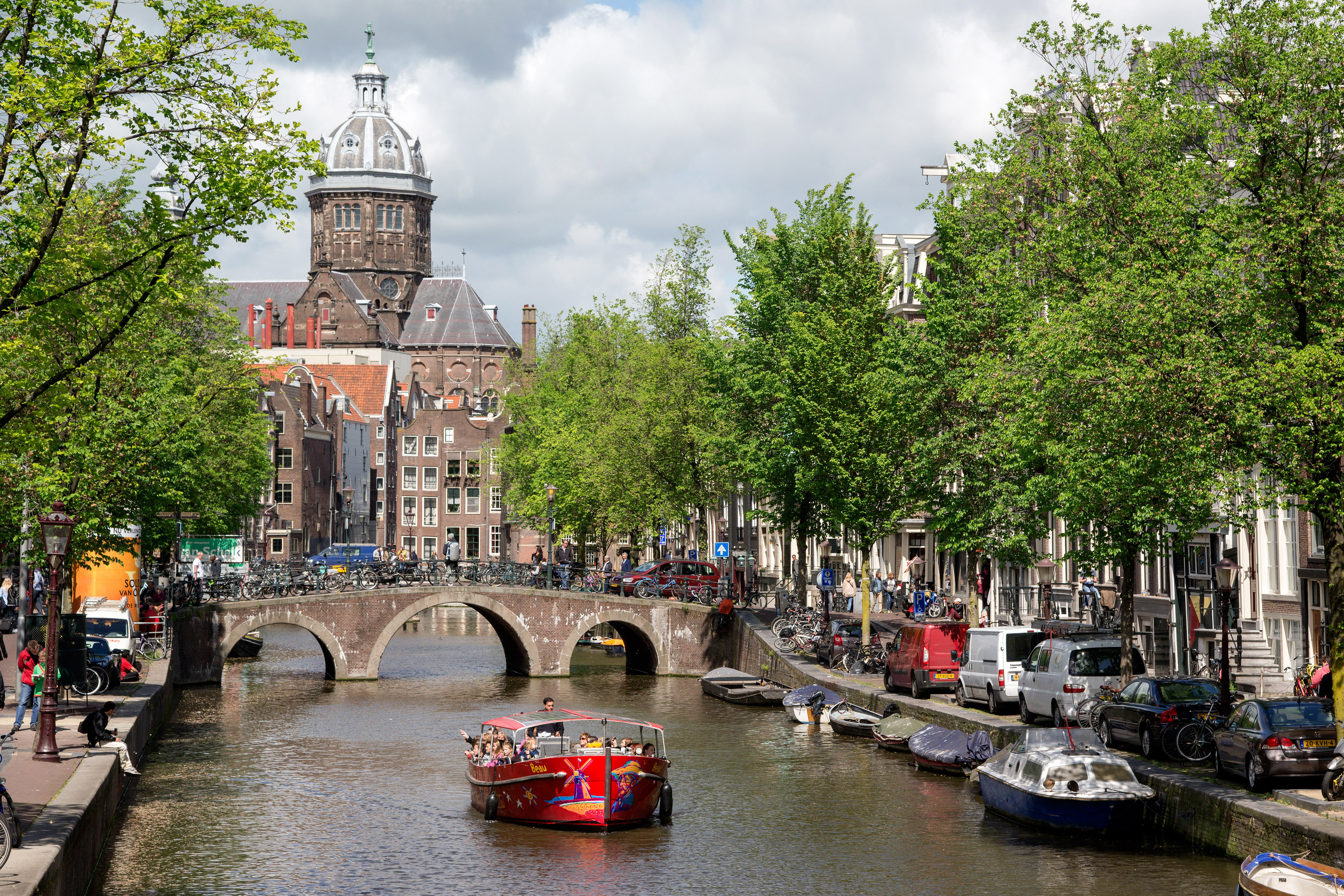
Amsterdam Canal Tour attractions site

- List of tourist attractions in Amsterdam

=== New Zealand ===
- Auckland
- List of World Heritage Sites in New Zealand

=== Nicaragua ===
- Tourist attractions in Nicaragua

=== North Korea ===
- List of tourist attractions in Pyongyang

=== Pakistan ===
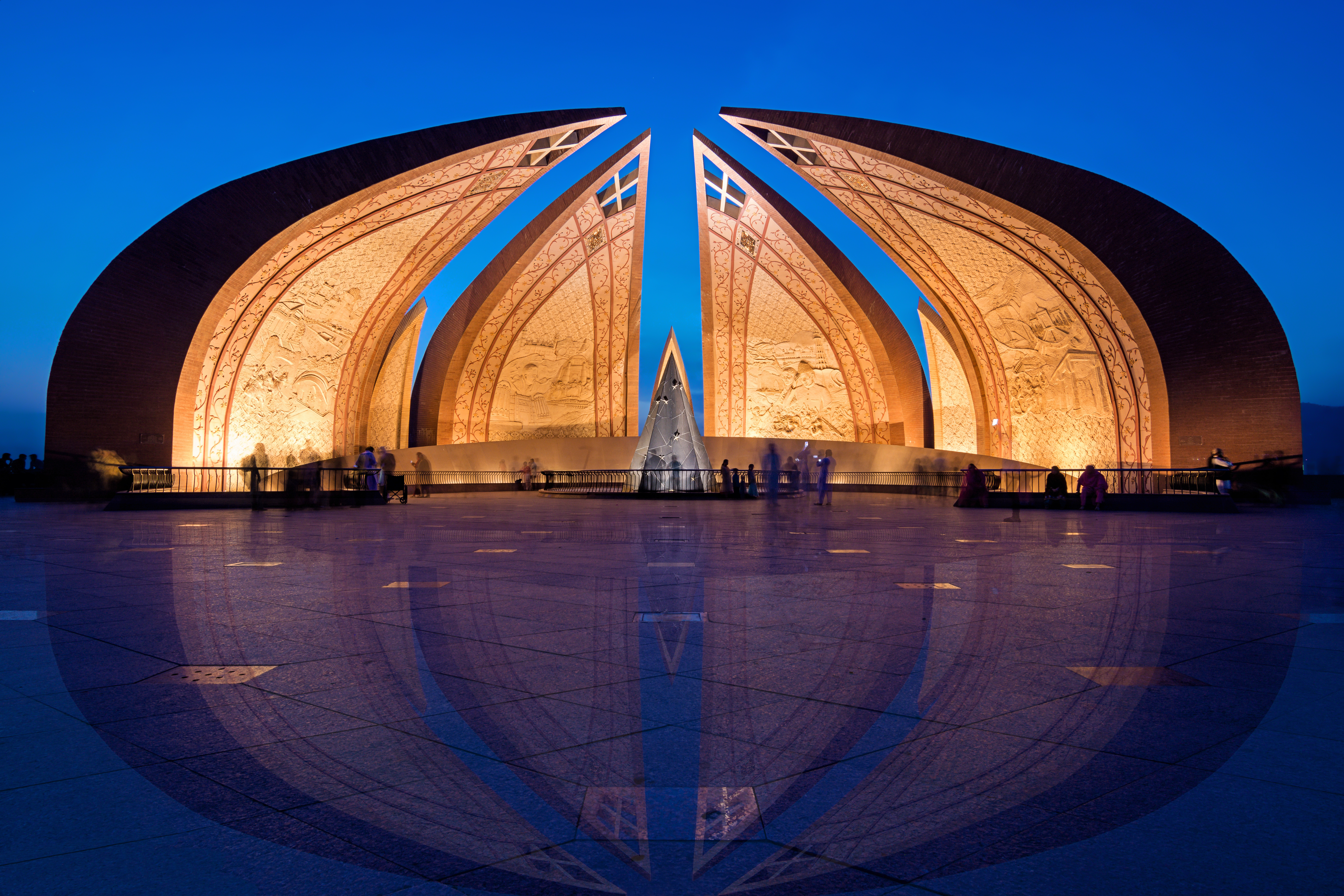
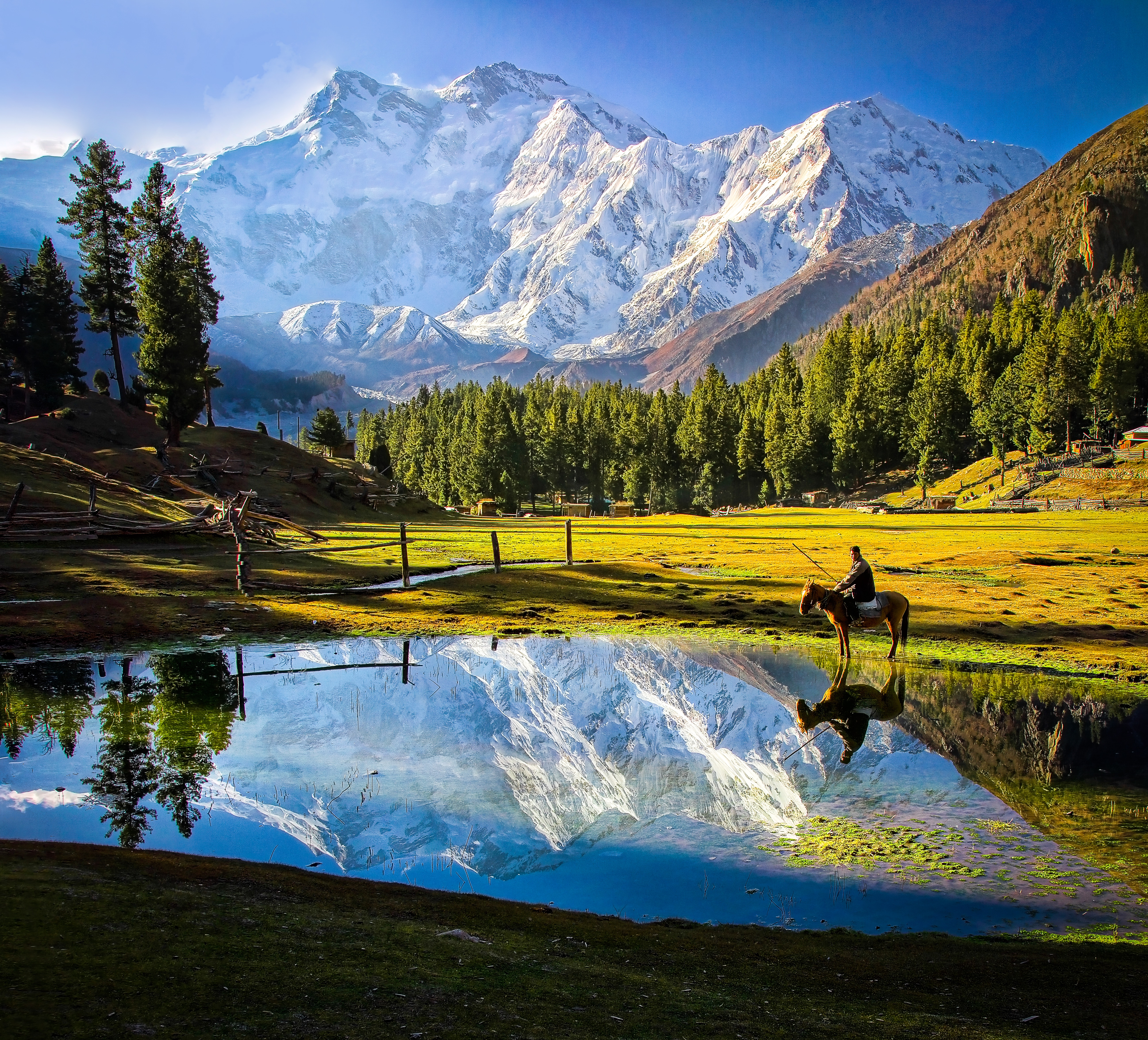
Pakistan: Pakistan Monument, Islamabad, and Fairy Meadows, Gilgit-Baltistan
- Archaeological sites in Pakistan
- Biosphere reserves of Pakistan
- List of barrages and headworks in Pakistan
- List of beaches in Pakistan
- List of birds of Pakistan
- List of botanical gardens in Pakistan
- List of bridges in Pakistan
- List of cathedrals in Pakistan
- List of caves in Pakistan
- List of dams and reservoirs in Pakistan
- List of endangered species in Pakistan
- List of faults in Pakistan
- List of festivals in Pakistan
- List of forts in Pakistan
- List of glaciers of Pakistan
- List of hydroelectric power stations in Pakistan
- List of lakes of Pakistan
- List of mammals of Pakistan
- List of mausolea and shrines in Pakistan
- List of minerals of Pakistan
- List of mosques in Pakistan
- List of museums in Pakistan
- List of mountain passes in Pakistan
- List of mountains in Pakistan
- List of national monuments of Pakistan
- List of national parks of Pakistan
- List of parks and gardens in Pakistan
- List of rivers of Pakistan
- List of Shiva Temples in Pakistan
- List of shopping malls in Pakistan
- List of stadiums in Pakistan
- List of Pakistani sweets and desserts
- List of valleys in Pakistan
- List of waterfalls of Pakistan
- List of World Heritage Sites in Pakistan
- List of zoos in Pakistan
- Tourism in Azad Jammu & Kashmir
- Tourism in Balochistan
- Tourism in Gilgit-Baltistan
- List of tourist attractions in Islamabad
- Tourism in Khyber Pakhtunkhwa
- Tourism in Punjab, Pakistan
  - List of tourist sites in Lahore
    - List of parks and gardens in Lahore
- Tourism in Sindh
  - Tourism in Karachi
    - List of tourist attractions in Karachi
    - List of parks and gardens in Karachi

=== Papua New Guinea ===
- Attractions in Papua New Guinea

=== Peru ===
- List of tourist attractions in Lima

=== Philippines ===
- Tourist attraction in the Philippines

=== Poland ===
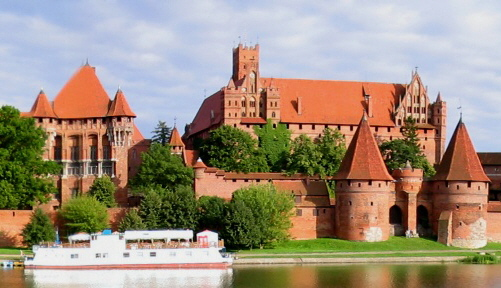
Malbork Castle, Poland

- Tourist attractions in Warsaw

=== Portugal ===
Fátima, Portugal

- List of World Heritage Sites in Portugal
- Christ the King statue in Almada
- Sanctuary of Our Lady in Fátima
- Marinha Beach in Lagoa, Algarve

=== Russia ===
- List of Moscow tourist attractions
- Landmarks of Saint Petersburg

=== Seychelles ===
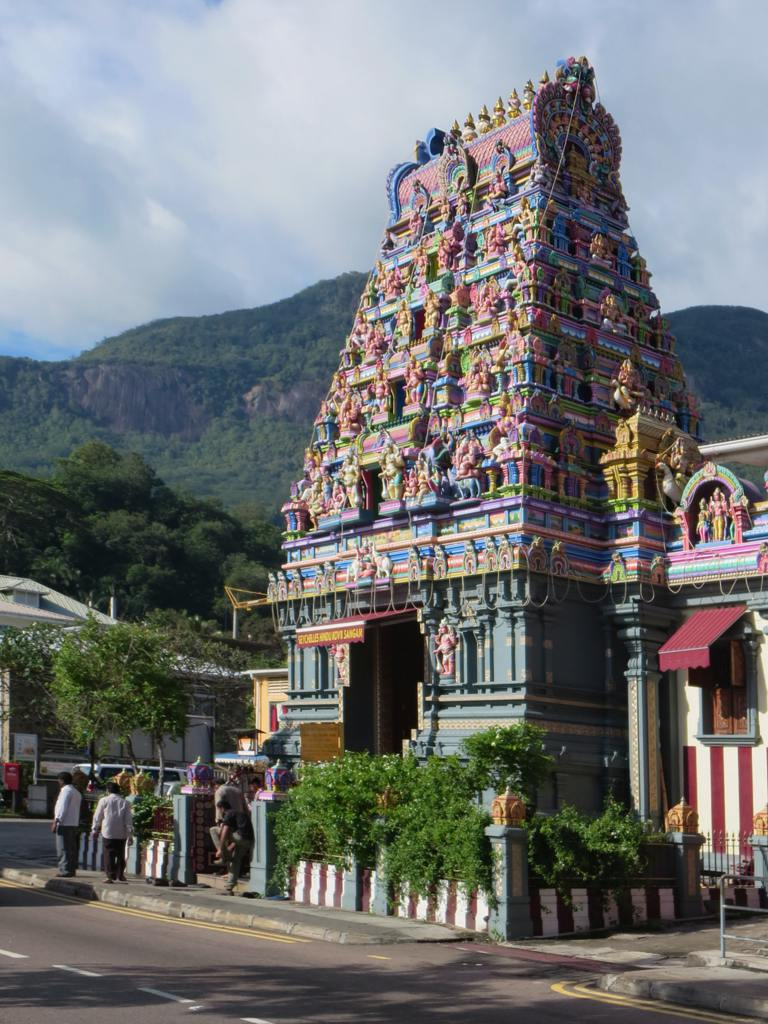
Hindu Temple Victoria, Seychelles Islands of Africa

=== Singapore ===
- List of tourist attractions in Singapore

=== South Africa ===
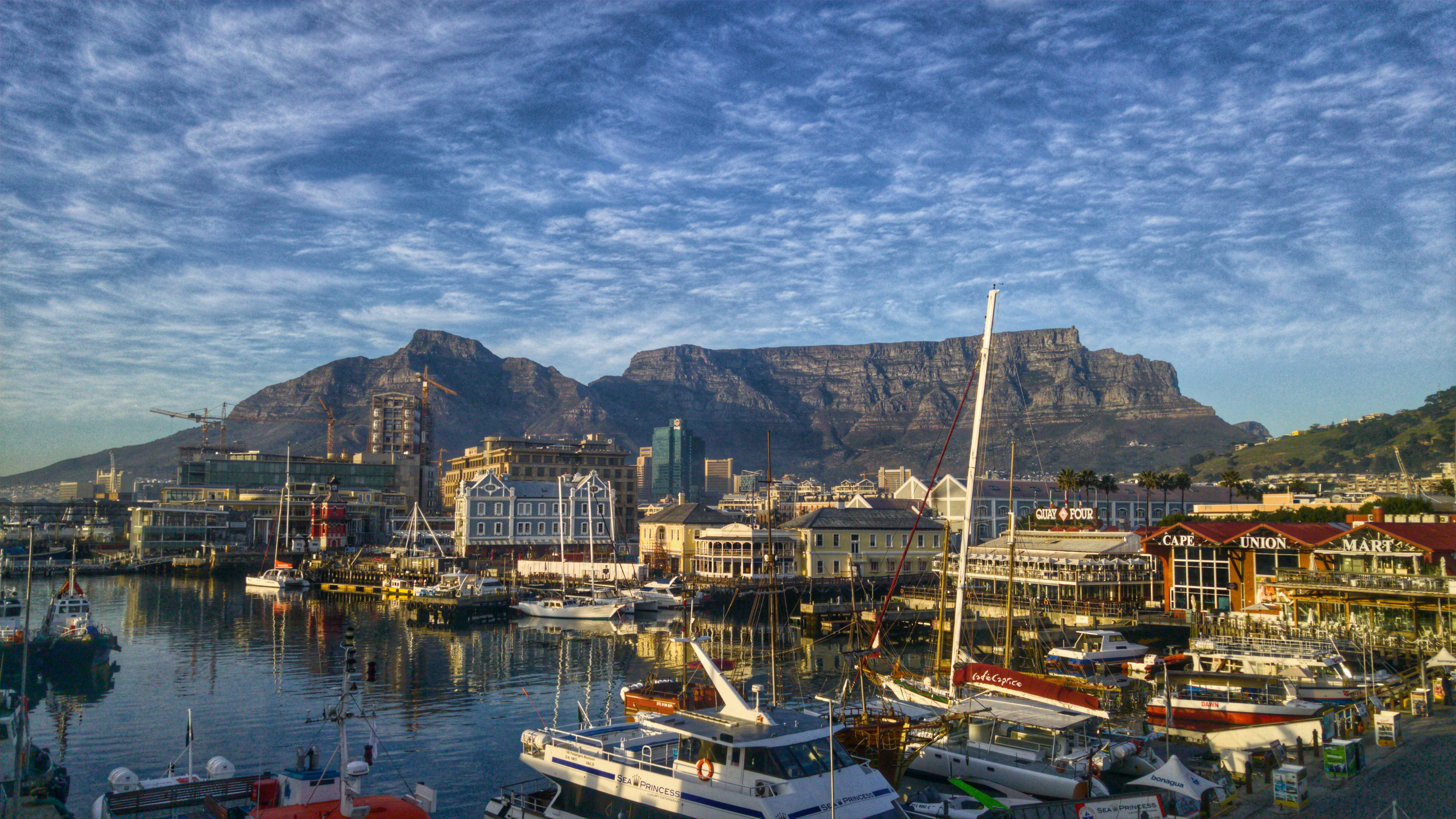
Cape Town-port-boats.

=== South Korea ===
- List of South Korean tourist attractions

=== Spain ===
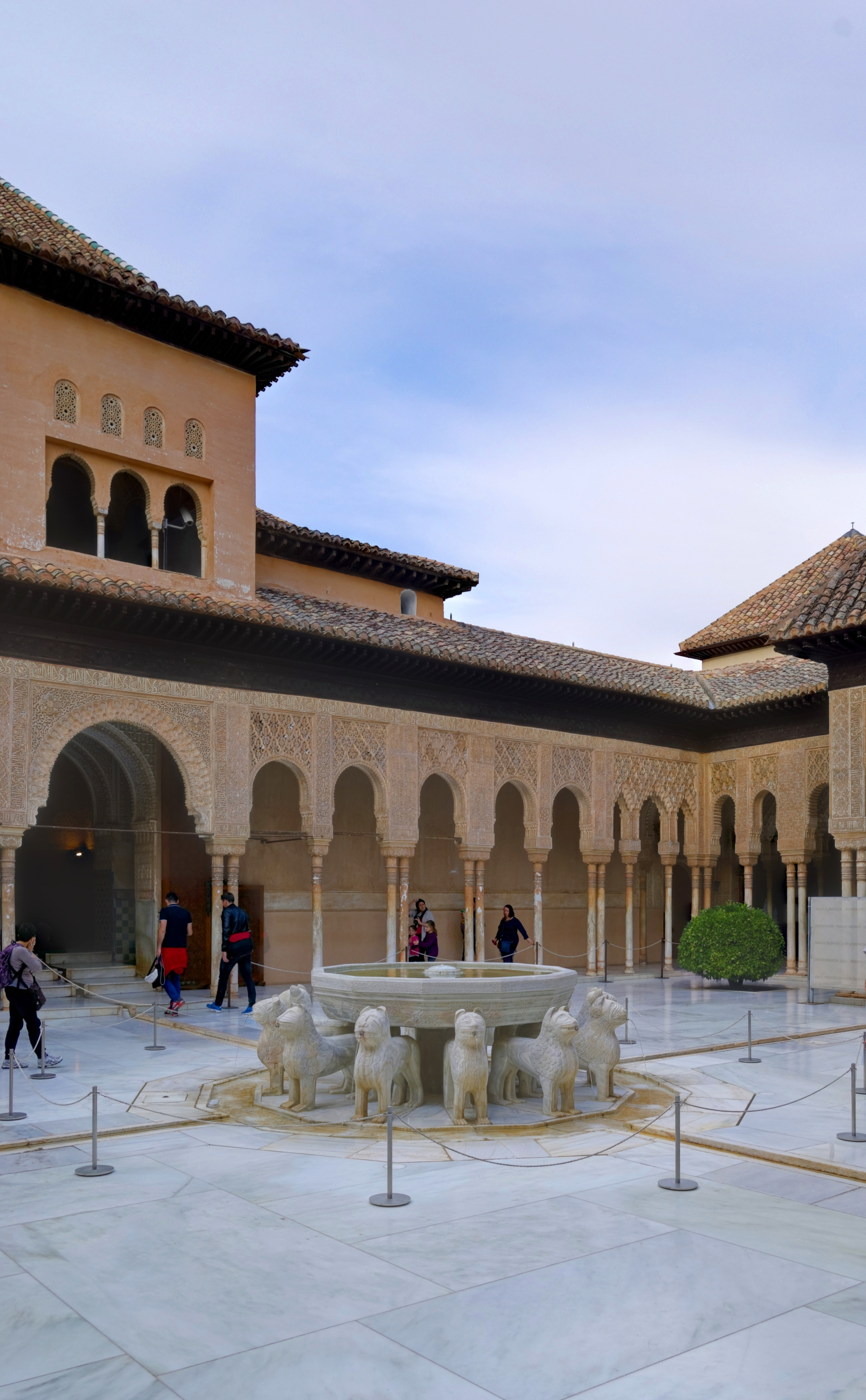
Patio de los Leones, Spain

- List of national parks of Spain
- List of World Heritage Sites in Spain

=== Switzerland ===
- Lists of tourist attractions in Switzerland

=== Taiwan ===
- List of museums in Taiwan
- List of tourist attractions in Taipei
- List of tourist attractions in Taiwan

=== Thailand ===
- Tourism in Bangkok
- List of national parks of Thailand
- World Heritage Sites in Thailand

=== Turkey ===
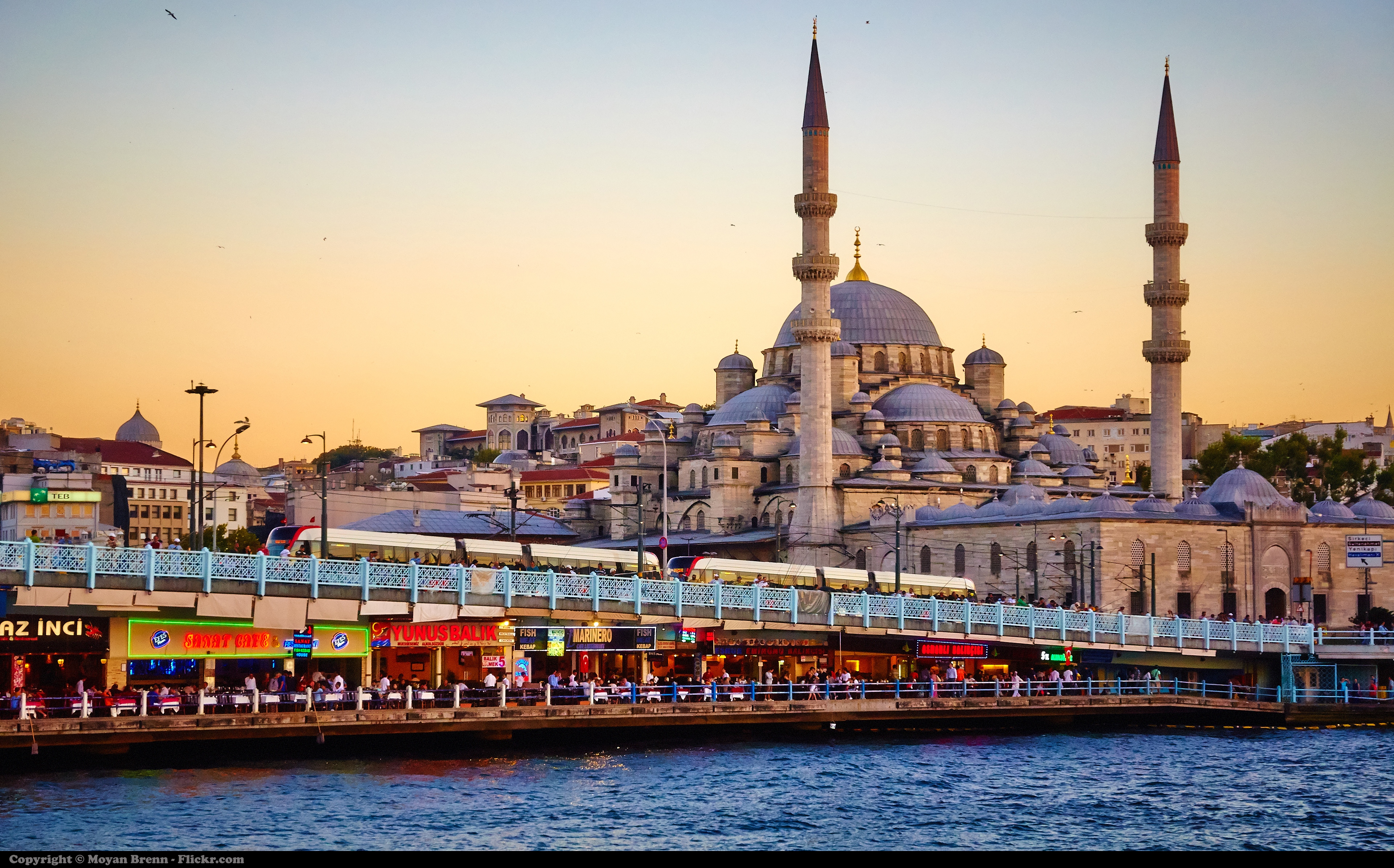
Mosque in Istanbul, Turkey

=== Ukraine ===
- List of museums in Ukraine
- List of World Heritage Sites in Ukraine

=== United Arab Emirates ===
- List of tourist attractions in the United Arab Emirates

=== United Kingdom ===
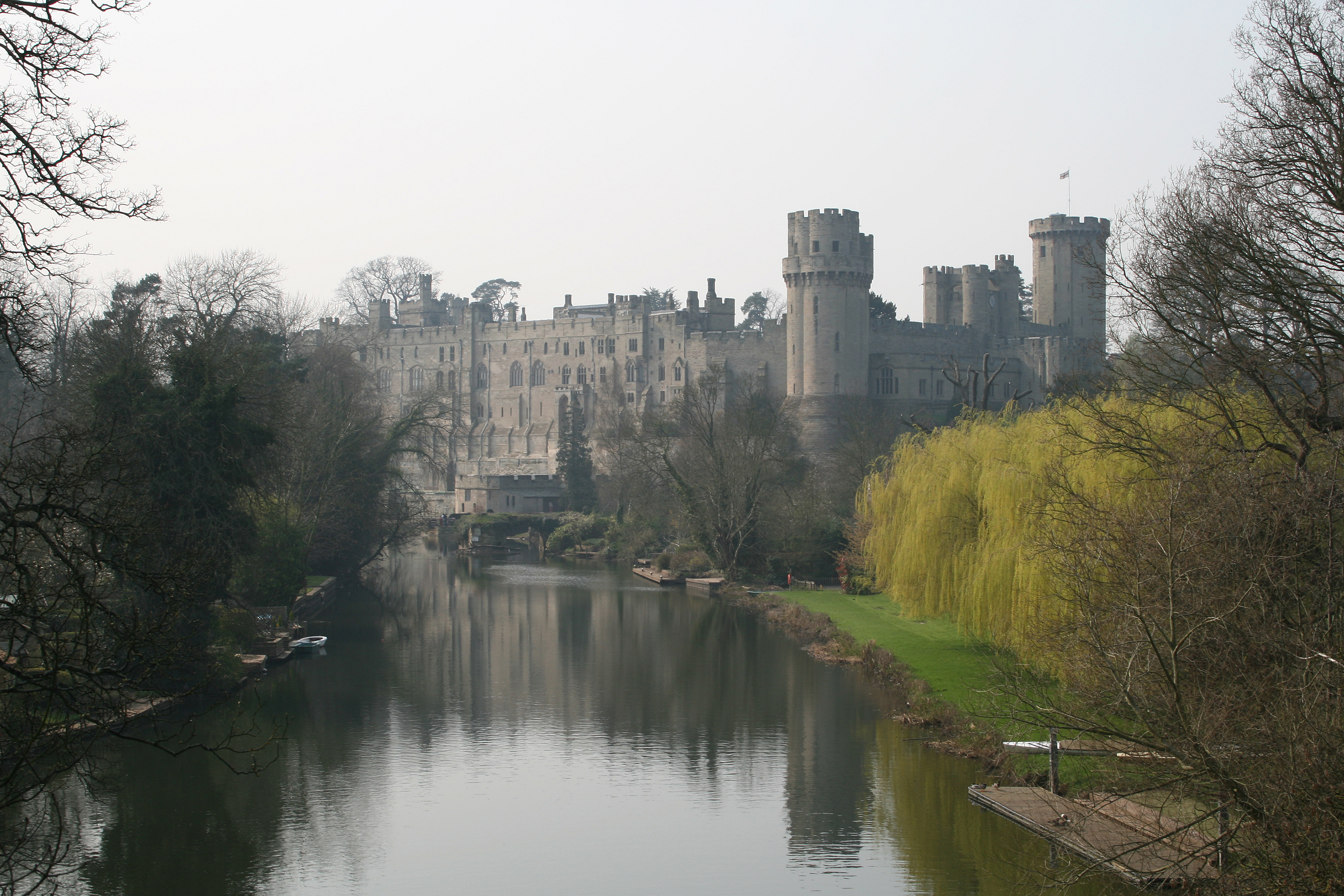
Warwick Castle, England

- Lists of tourist attractions in England
- List of tourist attractions in Northern Ireland
- List of tourist attractions in Scotland
- List of tourist attractions in Wales

=== United States ===
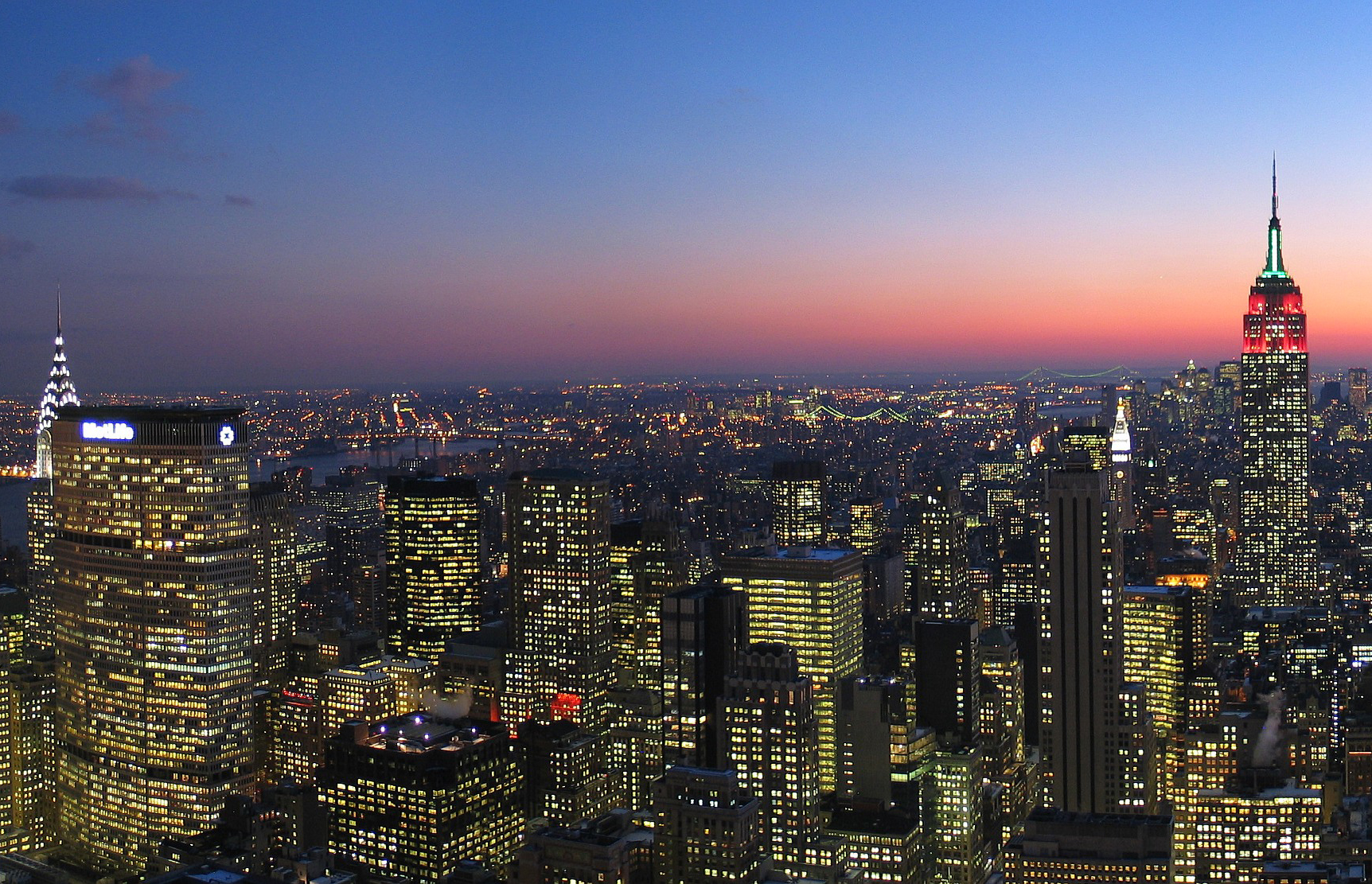
Manhattan, New York City, United States

- List of heritage railroads in the United States
- List of botanical gardens and arboretums in the United States
- List of museums in the United States
- List of national parks in the United States
- Art museums

=== Uruguay ===
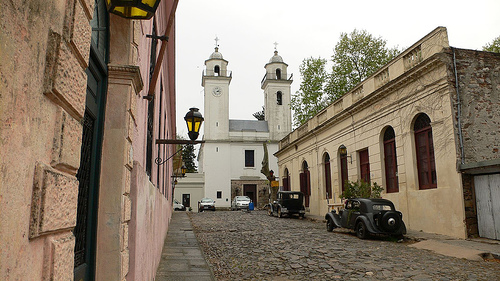
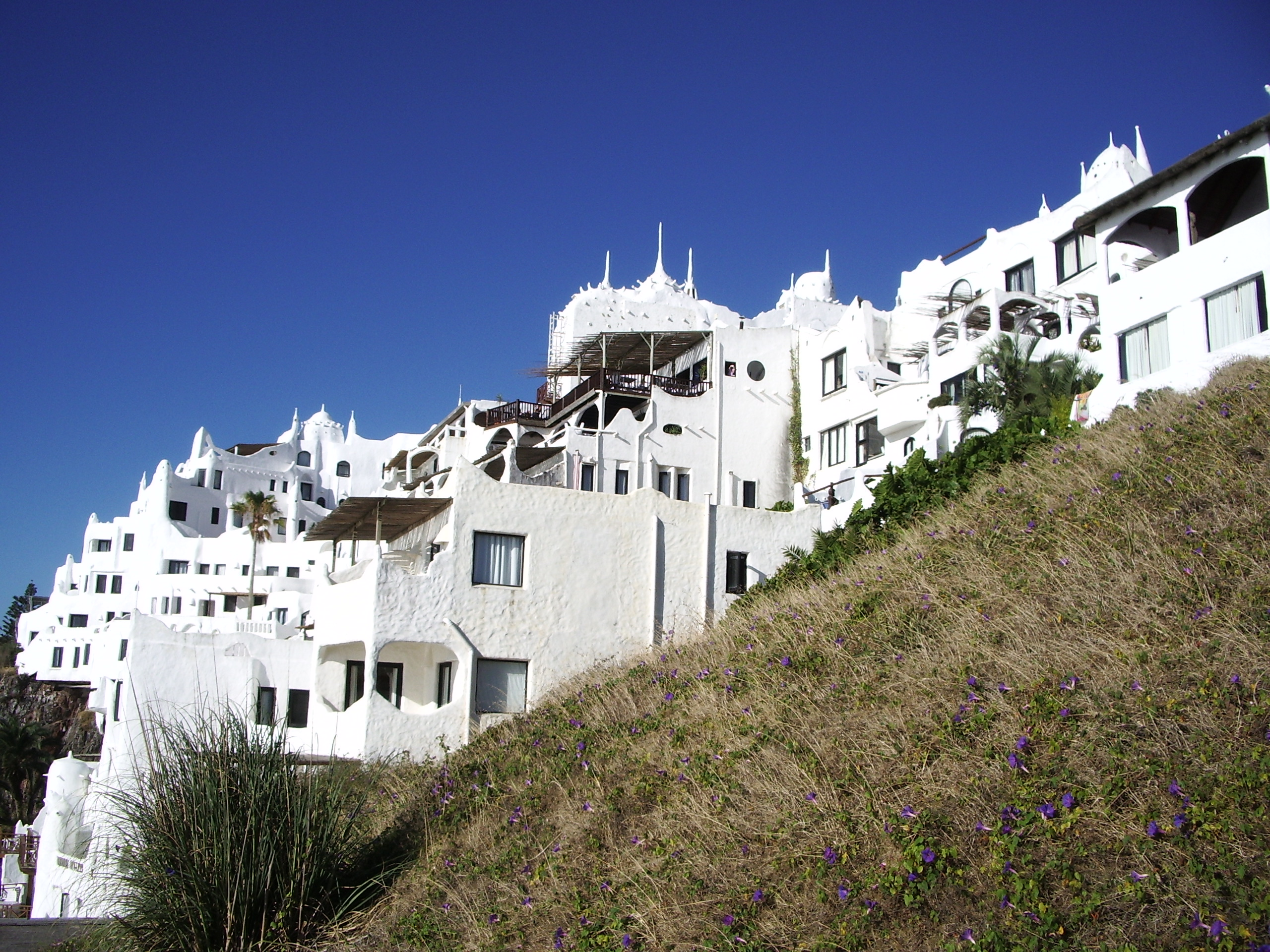
Uruguay: Colonia del Sacramento and Casapueblo, Punta Ballena

== See also ==
- Vacation spot (disambiguation)
- Landmark
- Overtourism
- Tourist trap
- Resort Town
