= Vacation spot =

A vacation spot may be:

- a park
  - see also wilderness
- other tourist attractions
- a bed and breakfast
- a luxury resort
- a megaresort
- a resort town
- a seaside resort
- a ski resort
- a "tourist trap"

== See also ==
- Lists of tourist attractions
- Tourist attractions in the United States
