= List of caves in Pakistan =

A cave or cavern is a natural void in the ground, specifically a space large enough for a human to enter. Caves often form by the weathering of rock and often extend deep underground. The word cave can also refer to much smaller openings such as sea caves, rock shelters, and grottos, though strictly speaking a cave is exogene, meaning it is deeper than its opening is wide, and a rock shelter is endogene.

== List of caves in Pakistan ==
Name	Location	Picture	Notes
Bazar Caves	Khyber		The Bazar Caves otherwise Bāzār Caves are located in the Khyber in the mountainous Federally Administered Tribal Areas of Pakistan.
Kai Caves	Sindh, Pakistan		Kai Caves are situated at ancient Kai valley in Sindh, Pakistan. The Kai valley is towards the south of Sehwan Sharif, Jamshoro District in Kirthar Mountains Range. Here, there are two sites of Kai Caves. One is upper which is towards the east at a high hill and second is towards the west at a lower hill. The lower caves are called "Satt Ghariyoon" (Seven Caves). Nearby the upper caves, the top of the hill is surrounded by very ancient compound wall which is constructed with stones. The remains of ancient settlement and very old potsherds have been explored. The discovered earthenware or ceramic material refers to earlier Indus Valley Civilisation while the period of caves has been considered as the Stone Age.
Kashmir Smast	Kashmir		The Kashmir Smast (Urdu: کشمیر سمست) caves, also called Kashmir Smats (کشمیر سمتس), are a series of natural limestone caves, artificially expanded from the Kushan to the Shahi periods, situated in the Babuzai Sakrah mountains in the Katlang Valley Mardan in Northern Pakistan. According to recent scholarship based on a rare series of bronze coins and artifacts found in the region, the caves and their adjacent valley probably comprised a sovereign kingdom in Gandhara which maintained at least partial independence for almost 500 years, from c. 4th century AD to the 9th century AD. For most of its history, it was ruled by White Hun (or Hephthalite) governors or princes.
Lahoot Lamakan	Balochistan		Lahoot Lamakan is a cave in Balochistan, Pakistan. The water oozes from outer limestone shell of the cave and believers have a fable that first it was milk, when people started to sell it, miraculously it became water. This place is amazing and eye-catching touristic resort. Fresh waters of natural springs continuously flow from mountains through the bed of hilly torrent. It is one of the spiritual, sacred, mythical and secret places of Pakistan. People have different religious legendary tales about this place. Many people believe that Adam was first positioned here at Lahoot La Makan. The footprint lies at Lahoot La Makan vale and the devotees believe as footprint of Caliph Ali. The people who visit Lahoot La Makan are called Lahooti. They visit by foot every year. The road leads from Karachi to Hub, Balochistan to Lahoot La Makan. It is at a distance of 110 kilometers from Karachi towards the north in Balochistan.
