= Kai Caves =

Caves in Pakistan

Kai Caves are situated in the Kai valley of Sindh, Pakistan. The Kai valley is towards the south of Sehwan Sharif, Jamshoro District in Kirthar Mountains Range. Here, there are two sites of the Kai Caves. One is the upper which is towards the east at a high hill and the second is towards the west at a lower hill. The lower caves are called "Satt Ghariyoon" (Seven Caves).

== History ==
Nearby the upper caves, the top of the hill is surrounded by very ancient compound wall which is constructed with stones. The remains of ancient settlement and very old potsherds have been explored. The discovered earthenware or ceramic material refers to earlier Indus Valley Civilisation while the period of caves has been considered as the Stone Age. In the vicinity of Kai Valley, close to Kai Caves, the other sites of Bulo-Ji-Buthi, Nuko-Buthi, Kai-Buthi and Naig have been discovered belonging to prehistoric and Chalcolithic periods. Dr. Louis Flam had visited the Kai Caves with native archaeologist Taj Sehrai in 1976.
