= List of tourist attractions in Swat =

Swat District (Urdu: ضلع سوات, Pashto: سوات ولسوالۍ, pronounced [ˈswaːt̪]) is a district in the Malakand Division of Khyber Pakhtunkhwa, Pakistan. With a population of 2,309,570 per the 2017 national census, Swat is the 15th-largest district of Khyber Pakhtunkhwa province. Swat has lot of tourist attractions comprised below:

== Lakes ==
- Bashigram Lake
- Daral Lake
- Izmis Lake
- Katora Lake
- Kundol Lake
- Mahodand Lake
- Pari Lake (Paristan Lake)
- Saidgai Lake
- Saifullah Lake
- Jabba Zomalu Lake
- Mushroom Lake (Swat)
- Kharkhari Lake

== Waterfalls ==
- Jarogo Waterfall
- Shingrai Waterfall

== Valleys ==
- Bahrain, Pakistan
- Gabin Jabba
- Gabral Valley
- Kalam Valley
- Malam Jabba
- Mankyal
- Marghuzar
- Miandam
- Matiltan
- Usho (Ushu Forest)
- Utror

== Monuments and landmarks ==
- Swat Museum
- Malam Jabba ski resort
- White Palace (Marghazar)
- Mahmud Ghaznavi Mosque (Odigram)

== Peaks ==
- Falak Sar (Swat), Ushu Valley of Swat, Pakistan
- Dwa Saray Ghar, Mountain on border between Swat, Buner and Shangla District
- Elum Ghar, Elum Mountain, location on border between Swat and Buner
