= Saifullah Lake =

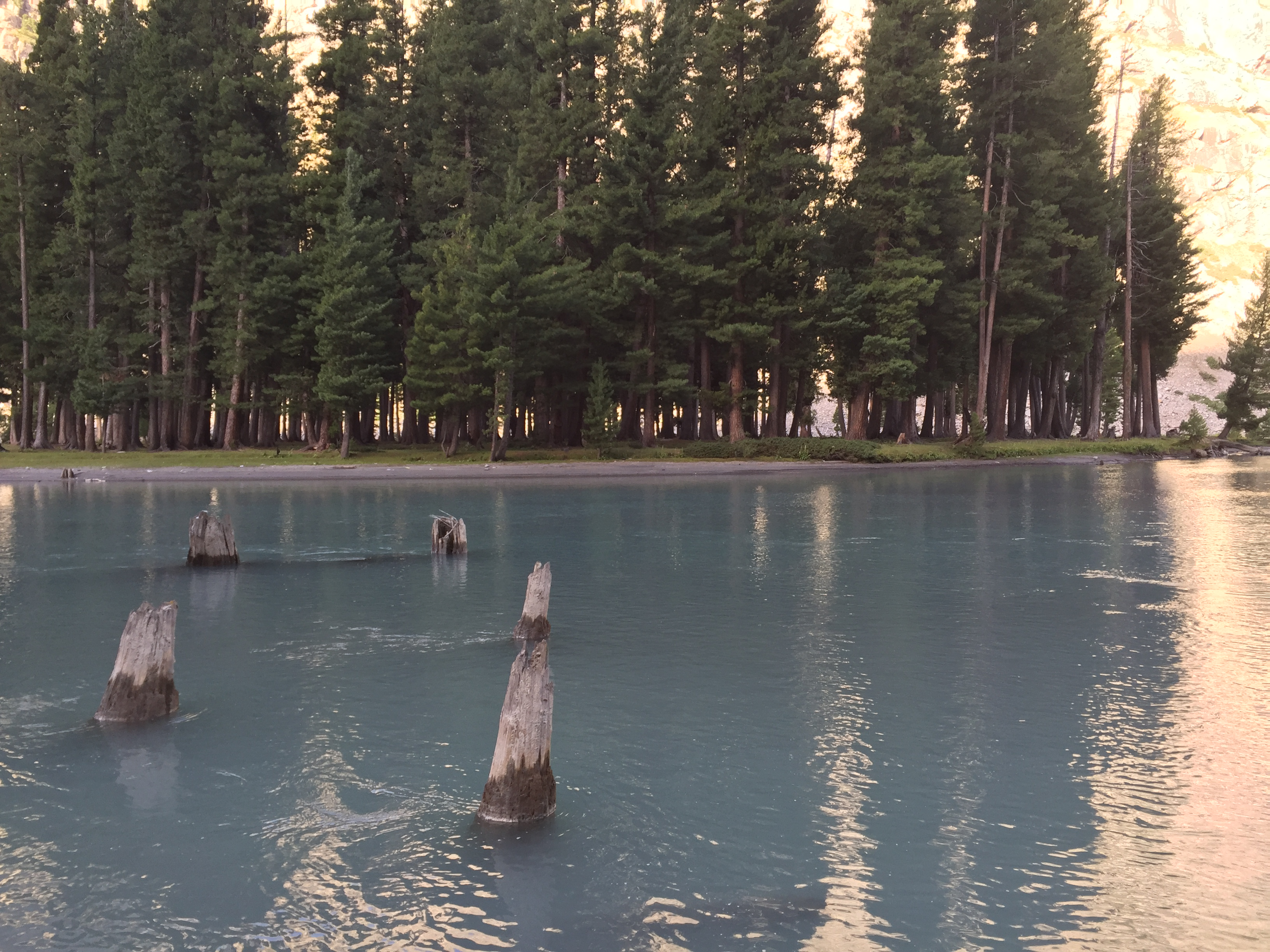
- Saifullah Lake in Swat Valley

- Location within Khyber Pakhtunkhwa
- Location: Kalam Valley, Swat Valley
- Coordinates: 35°05′00″N 72°39′58″E 35.721203°N 72.644517°E
- Lake type: Glacial lake
- Primary inflows: Glacial waters
- Primary outflows: Mahoo Dand
- Basin countries: Pakistan
- Surface elevation: 9,550 ft (2,910 m)
- Settlements: Kalam Valley

Saifullah Lake (Urdu: سیف اللہ جھیل; Pashto: سیف اللہ ڈھنڈہ, romanized: Saifullah Danda) is an alpine glacial lake located to the north of Kalam Valley in Swat District of Khyber Pakhtunkhwa, Pakistan. From Mahodand Lake, you can trek to Saifullah Lake or also access the lake through 4×4 vehicles. The trek to Saifullah Lake is just about 10–15 minutes.

== See also ==
- Katora Lake - Kumrat Valley
- Saidgai Lake - Swat Valley
- Mahodand Lake - Kalam Valley
- Kundol Lake - Kalam Valley
- Daral Lake - Swat Valley
- Lake Saiful Muluk - Kaghan Valley
- List of Tourist attractions in Swat - List of tourist attractions in Swat
