= Bashigram Lake =

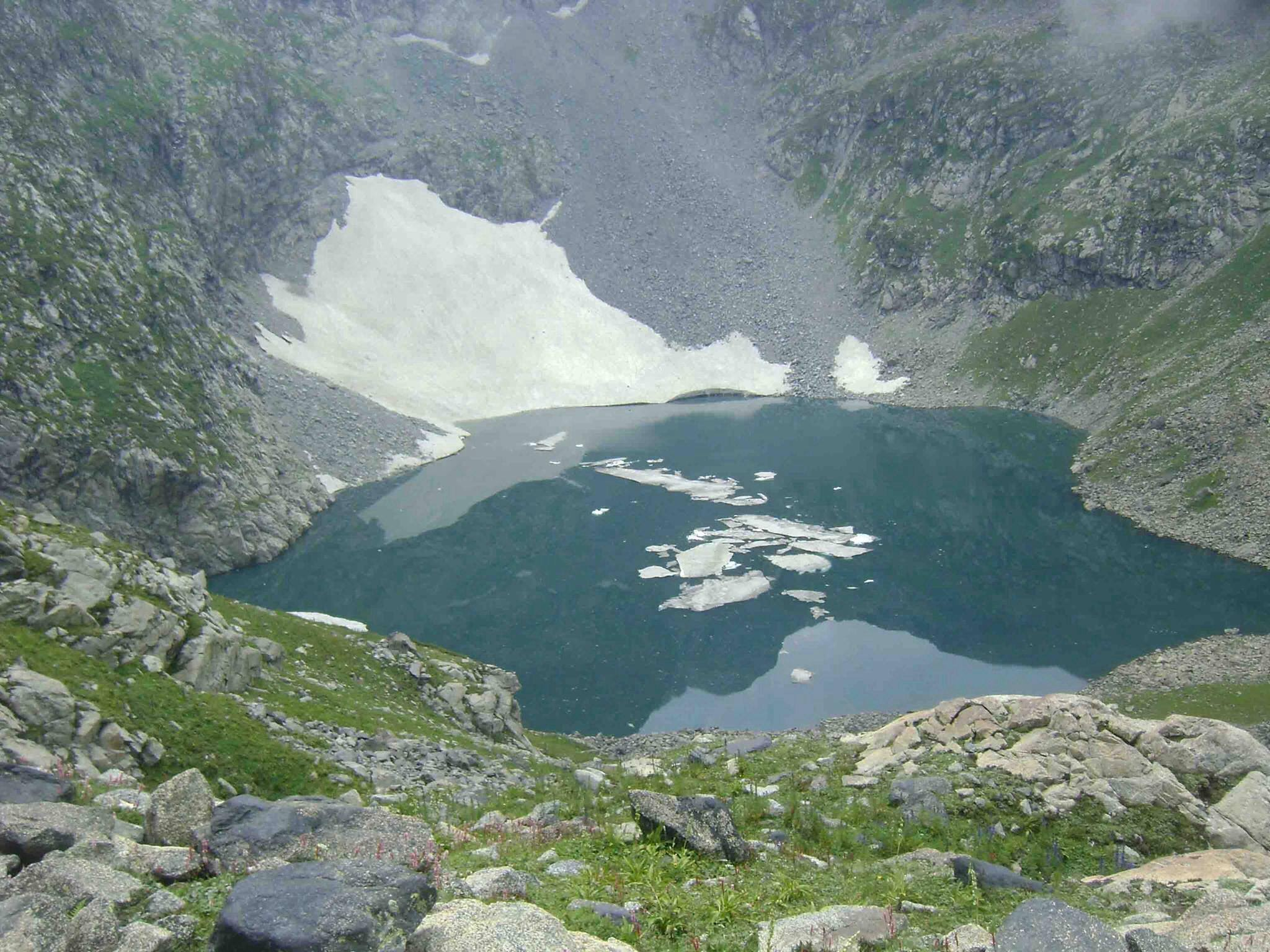
- Bashigram Lake in Swat Valley

- Location within Khyber Pakhtunkhwa
- Location: Madyan, Swat Valley
- Coordinates: 35°05′00″N 72°39′58″E
- Lake type: Glacial lake
- Primary inflows: Glacial waters
- Primary outflows: Chail Khwar
- Basin countries: Pakistan
- Surface elevation: 11,500 ft (3,500 m)
- Settlements: Madyan

Bashigram Lake also known as Bashigram Danda in Pashto is an alpine glacial lake located to the eastern side of Madyan in Swat District of Khyber Pakhtunkhwa province of Pakistan.

== See also ==
- Lake Saiful Muluk - Kaghan Valley
- Katora Lake - Kumrat Valley
- Saidgai Lake - Swat Valley
- Mahodand Lake - Kalam Valley
- Kundol Lake - Kalam Valley
- Daral Lake - Swat Valley
