= Izmis Lake =

Lake in Khyber Pakhtunkhwa, Pakistan

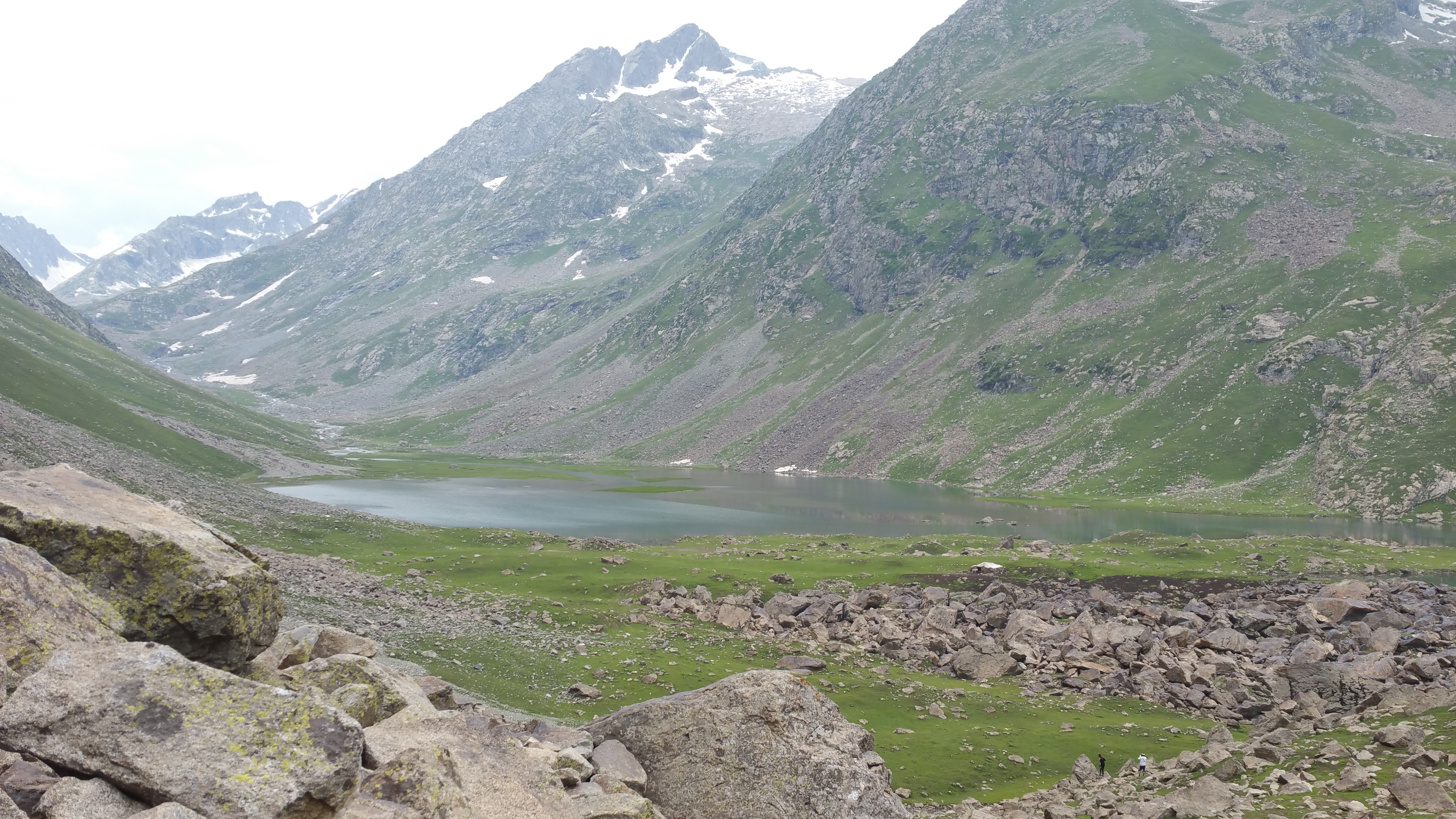

- Location within Pakistan
- Location: Swat District, Khyber Pakhtunkhwa, Pakistan
- Coordinates: 35.400°N 72.377°E

Izmis Lake is a lake in Swat District, Khyber Pakhtunkhwa, Pakistan, located to the south-west of Utror valley at a high altitude above the treeline. The name Izmis means "caves" in Kohistani, and as the lake is surrounded by several natural caves, the people have named the lake after these caves. A small jeep-able link road from Utror leads part of the way to the lake, ending in a valley called Loypanrghalay. The lake can be accessed from here after trekking for almost 3–6 hours.

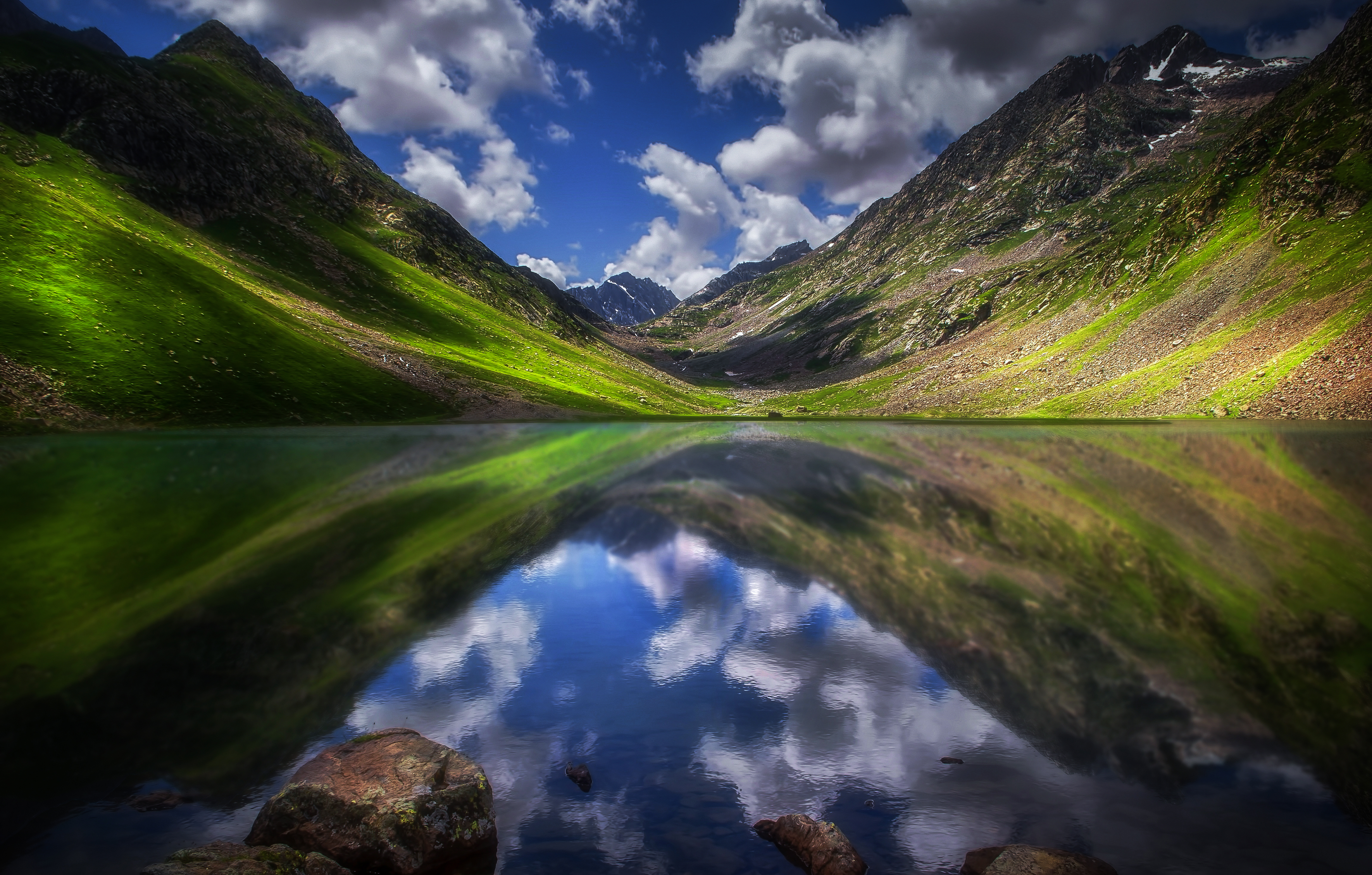
IZMIS LAKE

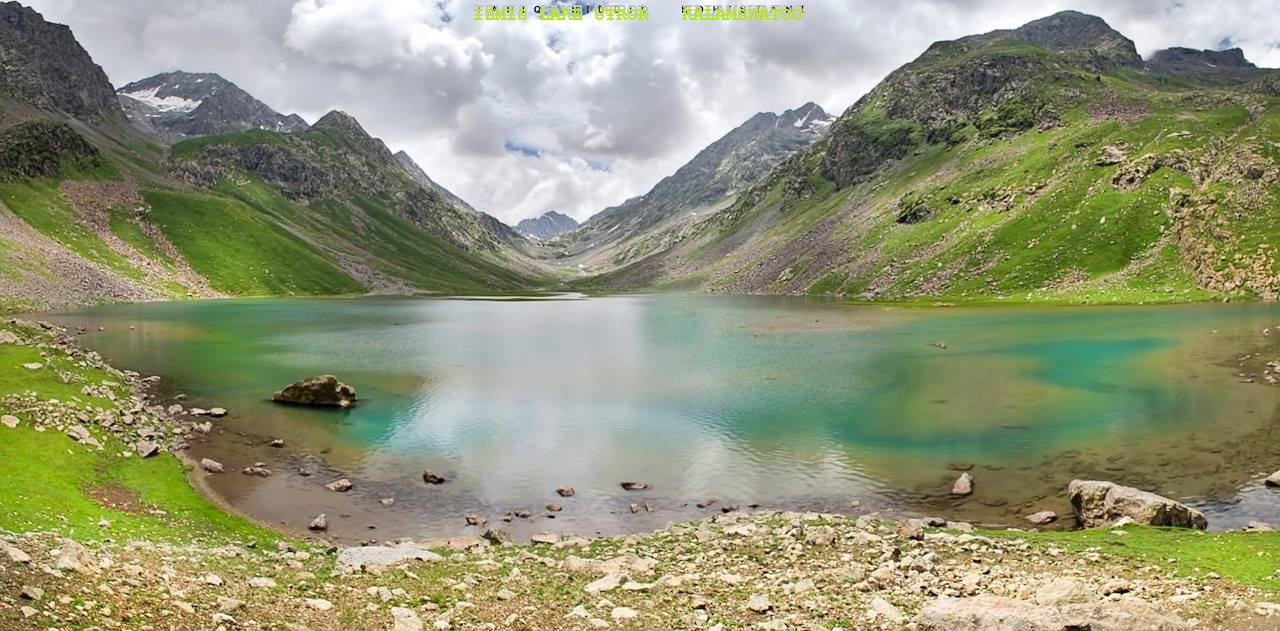
Izmis lake Utror Kalam Swat valley

== See also ==
- Katora Lake - Kumrat Valley
- Saidgai Lake - Swat Valley
- Mahodand Lake - Kalam Valley
- Kundol Lake - Kalam Valley
- Daral Lake - Swat Valley
- List of Tourist attractions in Swat - List of tourist attractions in Swat
