= Mushroom Lake (Swat) =

Lake in Pakistan

Mushroom Lake Swat
- Location within Pakistan
- Location: Gabral Valley, Kalam_Valley
- Coordinates: 35.635983°N 72.296603°E
- Type: Glacial
- Basin countries: Pakistan
- Max. length: 0 mi (0 km)
- Max. width: 0 mi (0 km)
- Surface elevation: 13,500 ft (4,100 m)

Mushroom Lake is a small alpine lake is located in the Gabral Valley of Kalam Swat. Mushroom Lake is called Mushroom because of its mushroom-shaped structure. It is Ten hours hike from Shahi Bagh Kalam.

Mushroom lake located in upper shahi bagh valley of swat, this is high alpine lake around 13500 feet above sea level. The awe-inspiring lake is located about 31 kilometres away from Utror and 20 kilometres from Shahi Bagh.

Google Map location is 35°38'9.54"N 72°17'47.77"E

== See also ==
- List of Tourist attractions in Swat
- Mahodand Lake - Kalam Valley
- Kundol Lake - Kalam Valley
- Daral Lake - Swat Valley
