= Jabba Lake =

Lake in Swat Kohistan, Pakistan

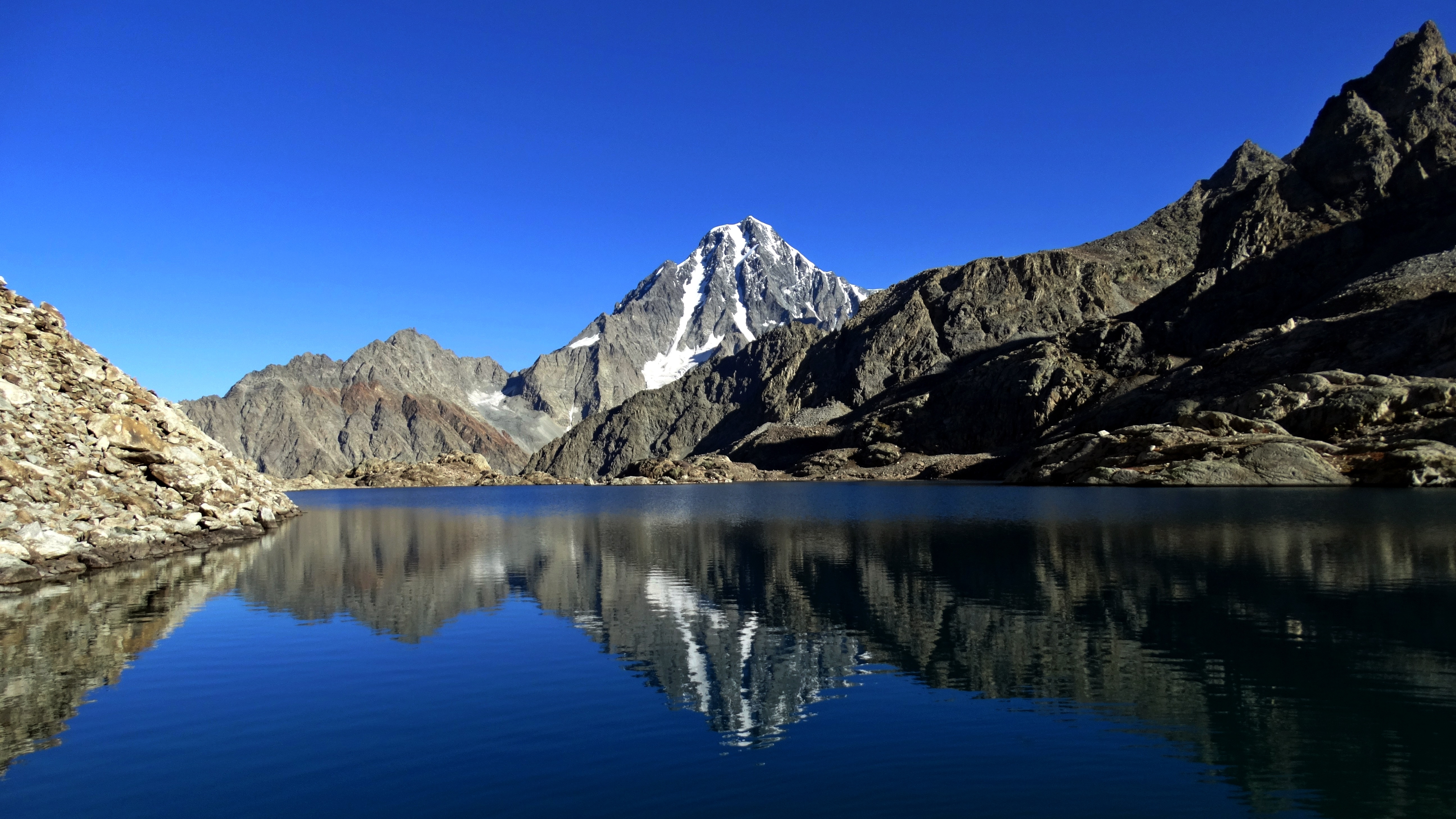

- Location within Khyber Pakhtunkhwa Location within Pakistan
- Location: Ushu, Swat Valley
- Coordinates: 35°37′26″N 72°47′55″E
- Lake type: Alpine / Glacial lake
- Primary inflows: Glaciers water
- Basin countries: Pakistan

Jabba Lake, also known as Jaba Lake is an alpine glacial lake located in the Ushu valley of Swat Kohistan region in northern Pakistan. Elevation of lake is about 14,000 feet above sea level.

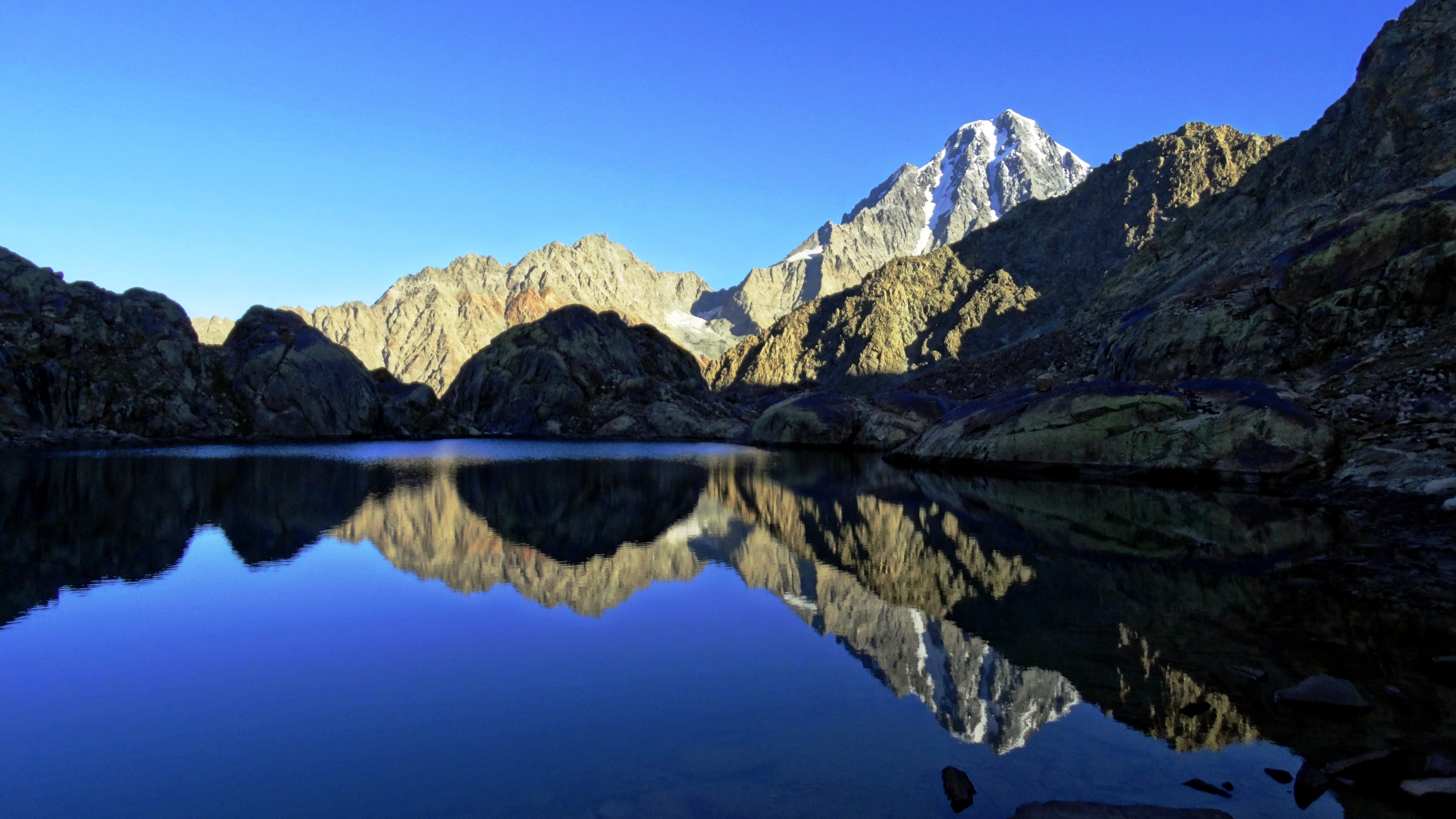
Jabba Lake

== See also ==
- Mahodand Lake
- Kundol Lake
- Daral Lake
