= Saidgai Lake =

Lake in Khyber Pakhtunkhwa, Pakistan

- Saidgai Danda
- سیدگئی جھیل (Urdu)
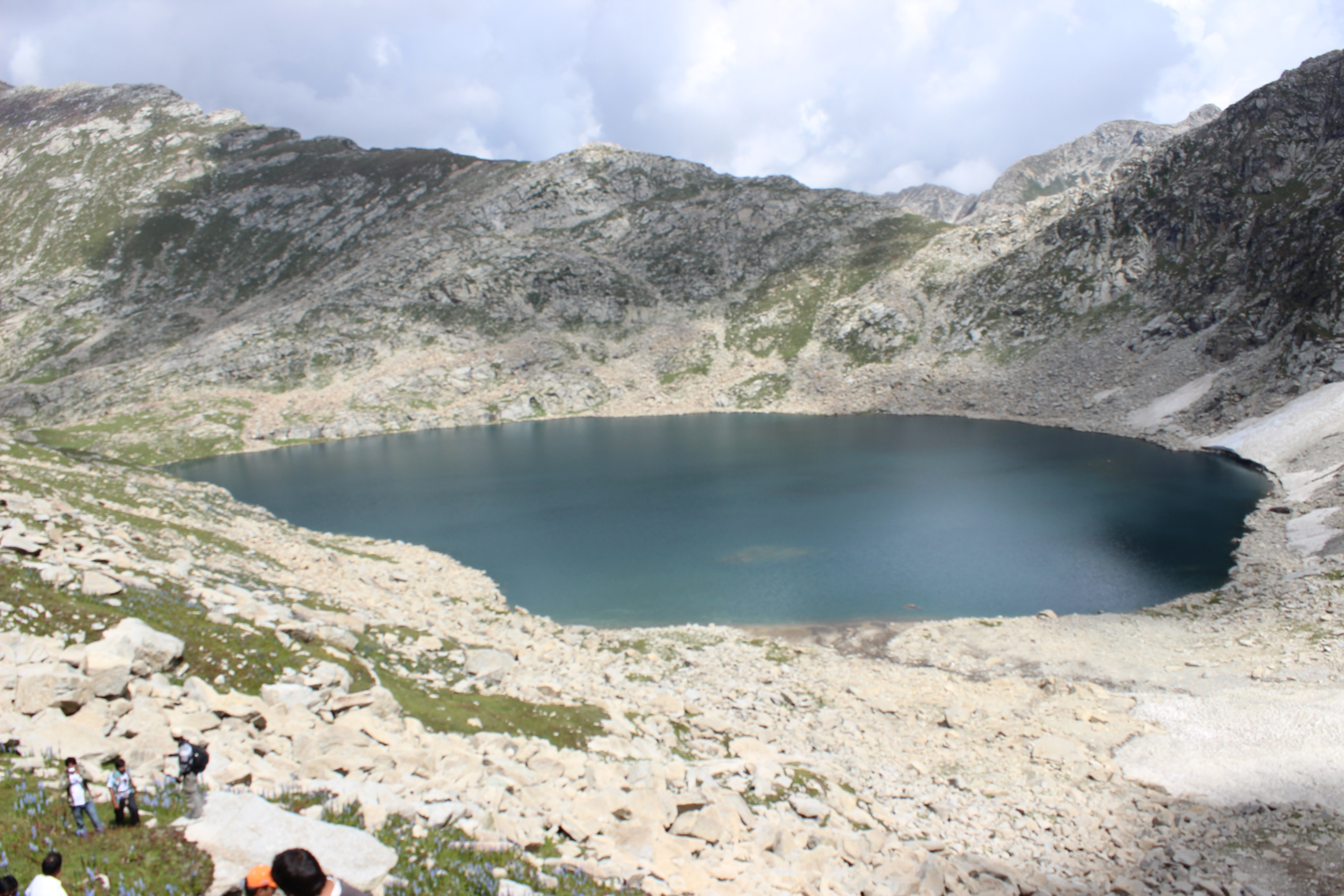
- Saidgai lake

- Location within Khyber Pakhtunkhwa Location within Pakistan Location within Asia
- Location: Ushirai Dara
- Coordinates: 35°11′30″N 72°19′30″E
- Lake type: Glacial lake
- Primary inflows: Glaciers water
- Primary outflows: Ushirai Khwar
- Basin countries: Pakistan
- Max. length: approx. 1 km (0.62 mi)
- Max. width: approx. 0.5 km (0.31 mi)
- Surface elevation: 11,500 ft (3,500 m)
- Settlements: Ushirai Dara

Saidgai Lake (Pashto: سيدګۍ ډنډ; Urdu: سیدگئی جھیل), also known as 'Saidgai Dand', is situated in the upper reaches of Ushirai Dara in the Upper Dir District of Khyber Pakhtunkhwa, Pakistan. Positioned at an elevation of 11,500 feet (3,500 m), it lies northwest of Gabin Jabba. During the warmer month, temperatures range between 5°C and 10°C. The lake is a popular tourist destination, especially from June to August, attracting visitors from Dir and other regions. For the remainder of the year, the lake is typically covered in snow. Saidgai Lake is close to the border between of Dir Upper and Swat.

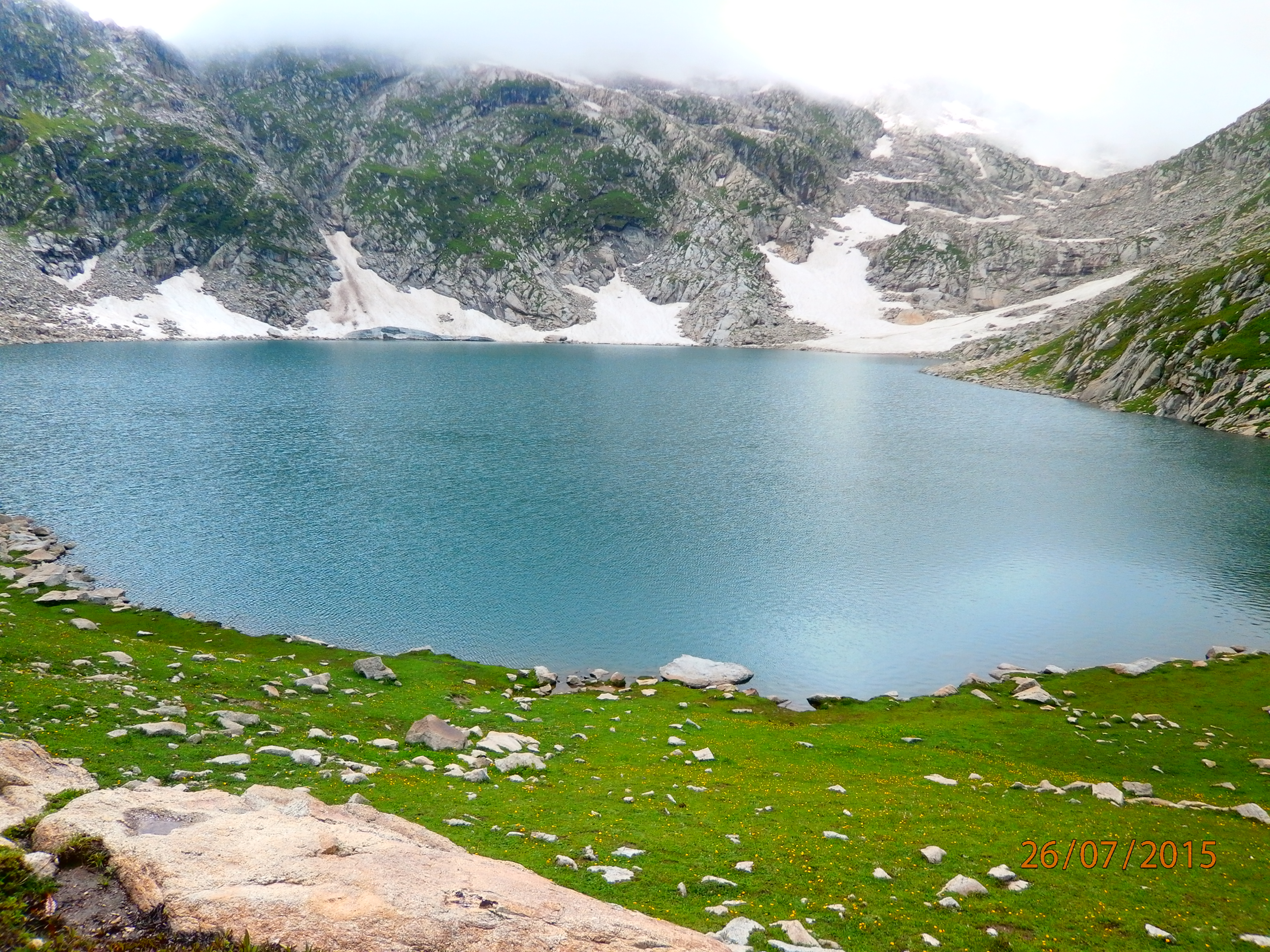
Siadgai Lake, Ushirai Dara

Saidgai Lake is located approximately 7–8 hours on foot from Ushirai Dara. Residents of both Upper Dir and Swat District claims administrative rights over the area.

Surrounded by high mountains and lush pastures, the lake spans roughly 1 km in length and 0.5 km in width. Its waters flow into nearby streams that eventually join the Panjkora River in Dir.

There are numerous legends and myths about the lake. Jinn's are popularly believed to live there.

== Access ==
The lake is accessible from three different trails and sides; Ushirai Dara, Upper Dir (shortest way) which is about 6 hours by foot, Sulatanr (Roringar Valley), Upper Swat and Lalko (Gabina Jabba); about 10 to 12 hours.

From Chitkarai, the distance by foot is around 4–5 hours.

- The Lalko Gabina Jabba
- Ushirai trail
- Another trail leads to the lake from Sulatanr which is also located in the northern tip of Roringar Matta, Swat.

== See also ==
- Lake Saiful Muluk - Kaghan Valley
- Katora Lake - Kumrat Valley
- Mahodand Lake - Kalam Valley
- Kundol Lake - Kalam Valley
- Daral Lake - Swat Valley
- Izmis Lake - Swat Valley
- Pari Lake - Swat Valley
