= Pari Lake =

Lake in Pakistan

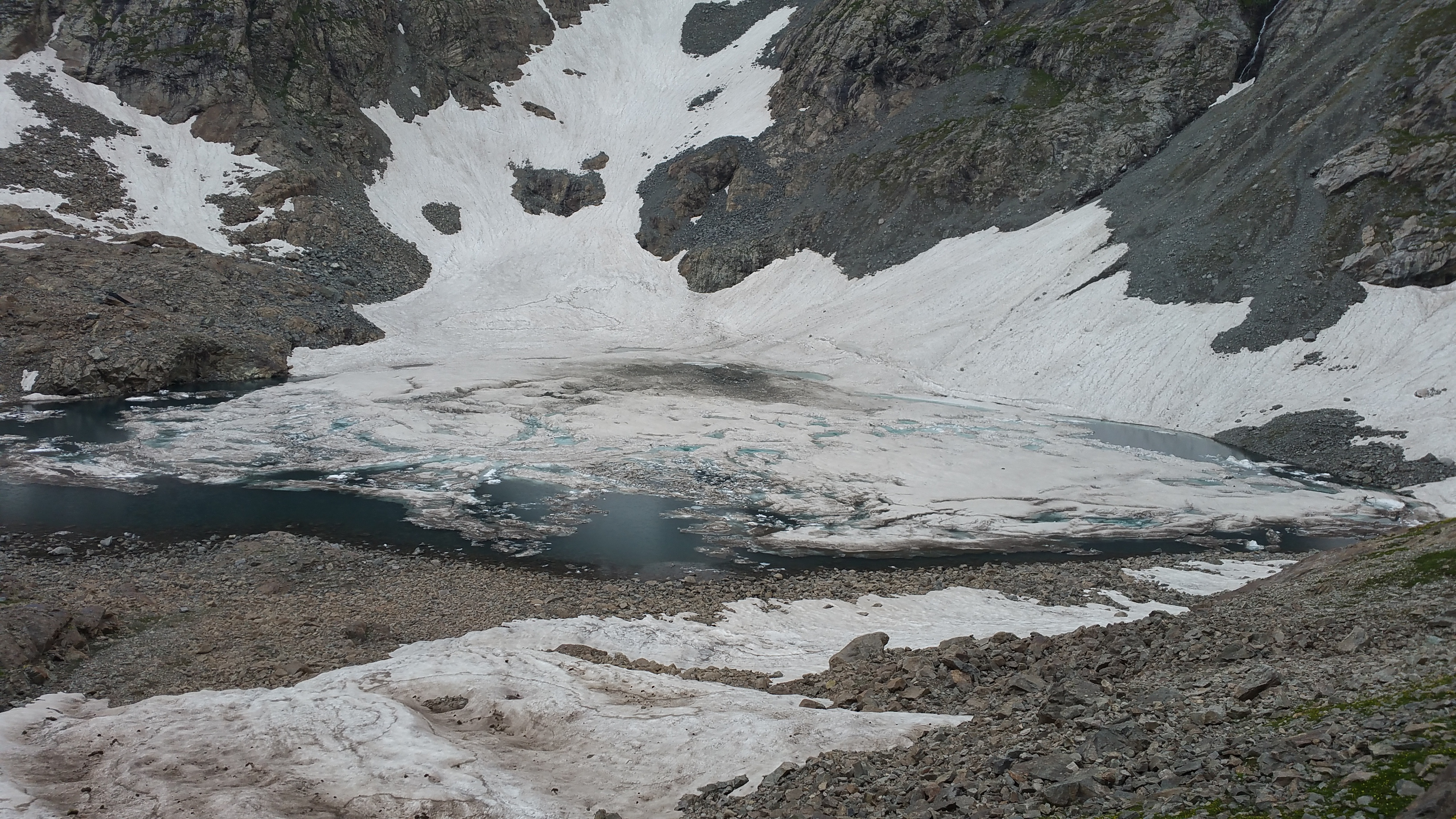
- Frozen Pari Lake, Swat Valley

- Location within Khyber Pakhtunkhwa
- Location: Swat Valley
- Coordinates: 35°24′8″N 72°24′46″E
- Basin countries: Pakistan
- Surface elevation: 4,402 metres (14,442 ft)
- Settlements: Utror, Kalam, Swat Valley

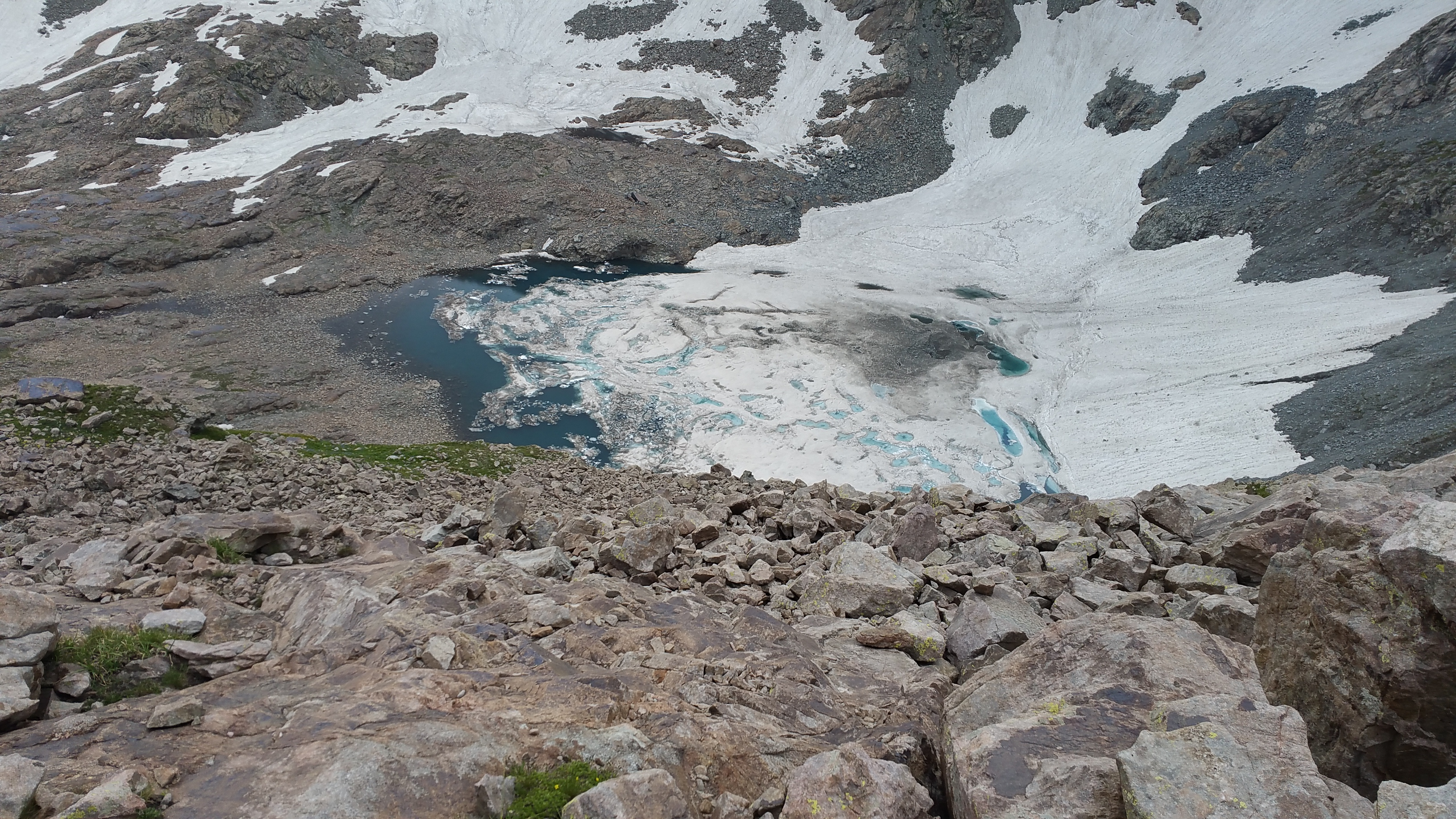
Pari Lake, Swat Valley

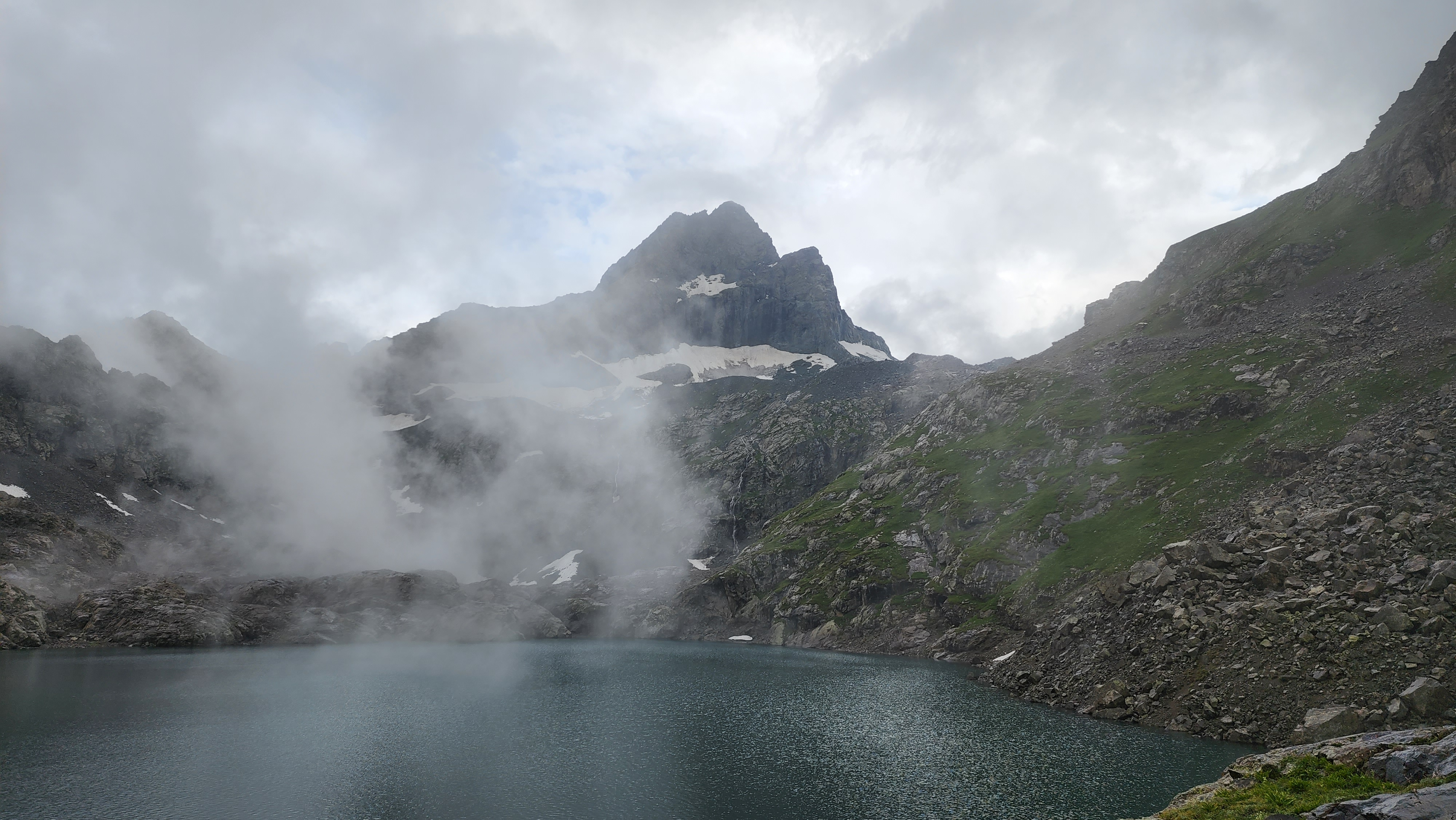

Pari Lake is located approximately 14,442 feet (4,402 m) above sea level, in the mountain ranges of Utror Valley, Kalam, Swat Valley, Khyber Pakhtunkhwa, Pakistan. It is comparatively greater in size and depth than the other lake in its vicinity and remains open from July till September. The western face of the lake is open and its water flows down to the gigantic Kundol Lake which is situated in the foothills. There are in fact two lakes that share the common name and are sometimes referred to as lake 1 and lake 2.

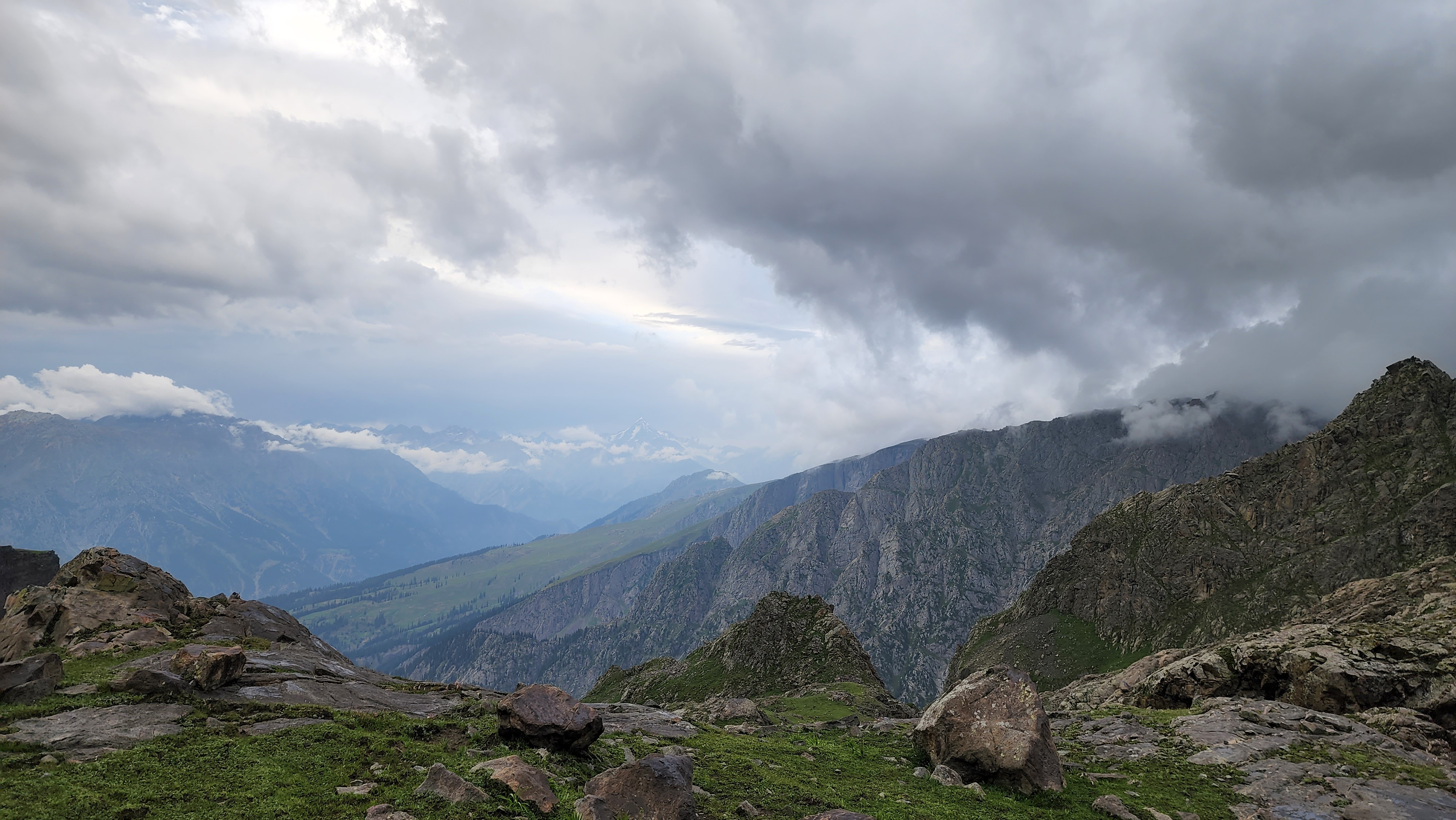
Falak sar (the highest mountain in swat Valley) can be seen from Khapiro Lake 2

The name pari or Khapiro is given to this lake because of the belief that it is the abode of fairies, where they reside and bathe in the pure, cool and clear water of the lake. This lake is situated to the northeast of the Utror Valley from where it is accessible by trekking. This trek is very dangerous, as the path way is often narrow with bends and turns and caution is advised.

== See also ==
- Kundol Lake
- Mahodand Lake
- Saidgai Lake
