= Gabin Jabba =

Hill station in Swat, Pakistan

Coordinates: 35°10′N 72°22′E

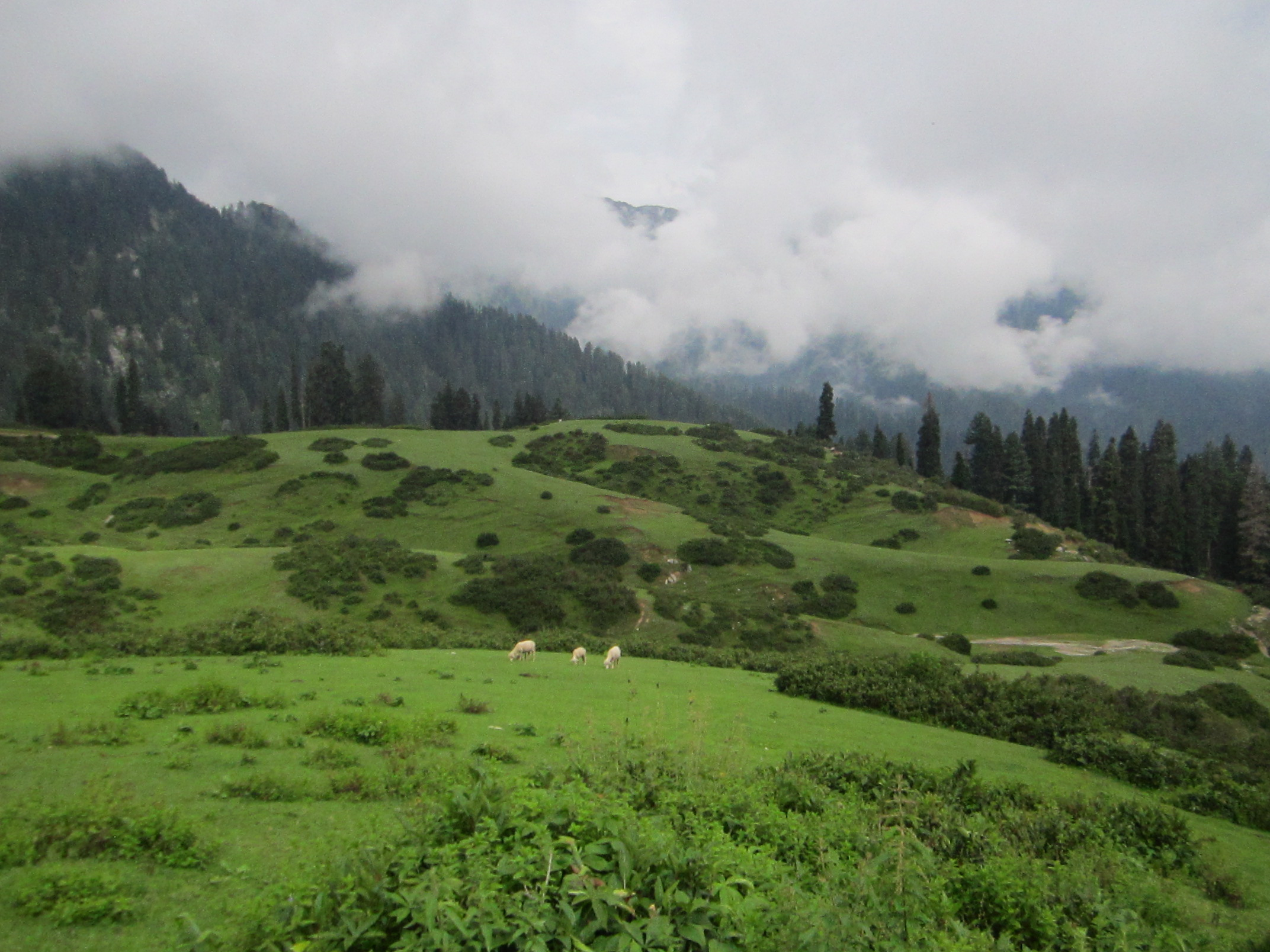
Gabin Jabba

Gabin Jabba (Pashto: ګبين جبه; lit. 'Honey moorland') is located approximately 65 km from Mingora on Matta Sakhra road within the Swat valley of the Khyber Pakhtunkhwa province of Pakistan. It is an area in Swat Valley with green meadows, thick forests, snow-clad mountains, mineral springs and high peaks. Gabin Jabba elevation is 2582 m (8471 ft) from the sea level.

The region has some medicinal plants, attracting researchers who undertake researches in this region. Honey Bees are found here, contributing to the Swat honey, famous throughout Khyber Pakhtunkhwa. Moreover, Gabin Jabba serves as a gateway to the Daral Lake, situated at an elevation of over 500 meters beyond Gabin Jabba's altitude.

"It is sometimes referred to as Jargo Waterfall's duplicate due to their similarities."

Birds

The entire track from the base to the top is flooded with songs of several species of birds. The most common ones with melodious vocalizations are the Western Crowned Warblers. Other than that, Variegated Laughingthrush, Blue Whistling Thrush, Eurasian Blackbird, Large-billed crow, Long-tailed Minivet, Brownish-flanked Bush Warbler, Common Myna and Jungle Myna are found in the forested parts of the valley.

The cold stony river supports Plumbeous Redstarts and Little Forktails quite in good number.

== Lalko village ==
The region of Gabina Jabba is closely linked with the village of Lalko, which is situated to the north of the region and serves as a gateway to Gabin Jabba. It is the first settlement met on the way to Gabin Jabba, from where it can be accessed through a four-wheel drive vehicle. It also hosts a base camp of a trail that leads to an alpine glacial lakes of Daral and Saidgai.

Lalko Valley is located on the northern upper reaches of the Matta Tehsil of Swat Valley, placed at a distance of 55 km away from the headquarter Saidu Sharif, which is a green, forested zone, covered with alpine pastures and receives heavy snowfall in winter season. Sulatanr is located to the western side of the region at lengthy trek.

== See also ==
- Swat Valley
