= Katora Lake =

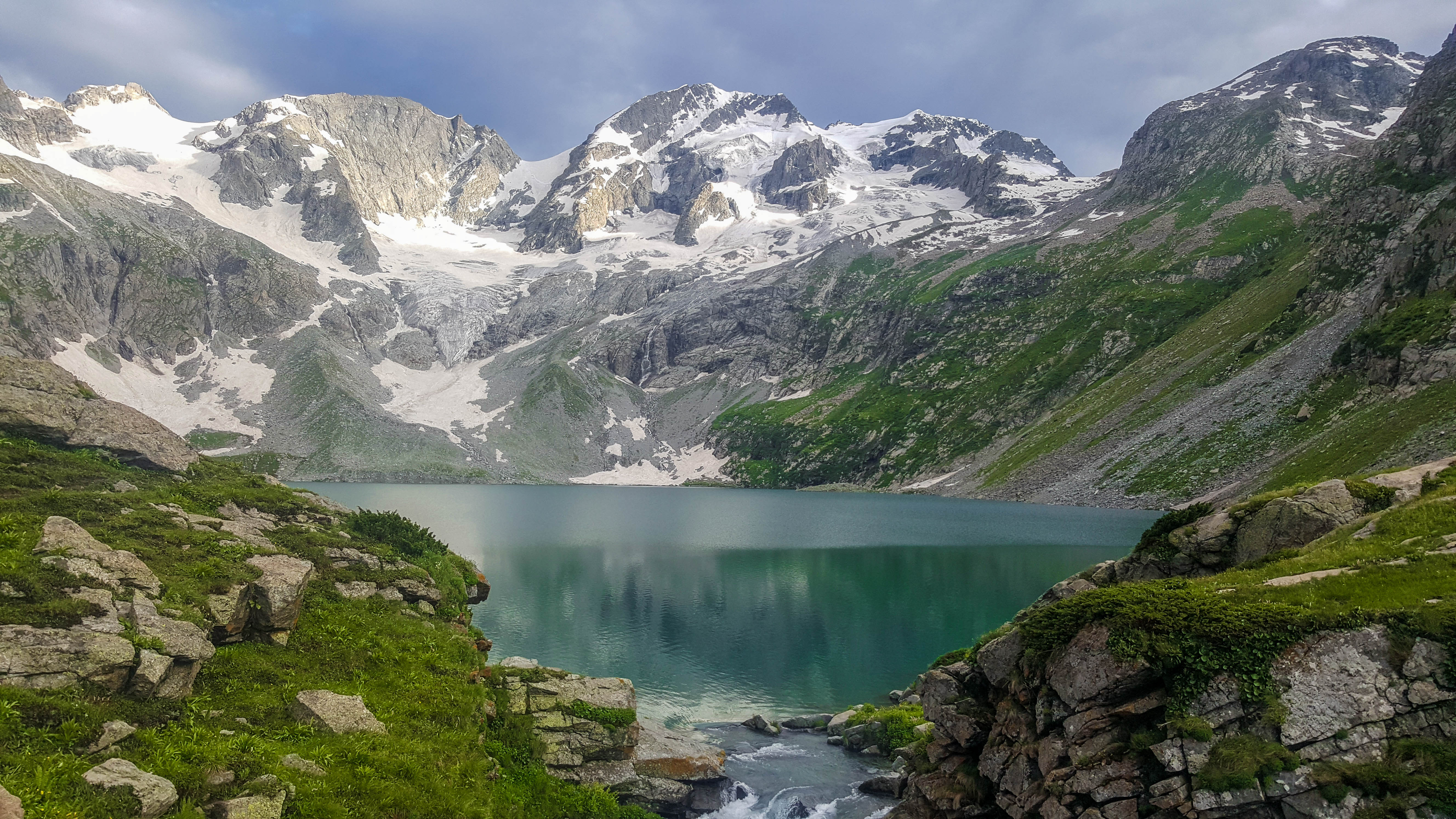

- Location within Khyber Pakhtunkhwa
- Location: Kumrat Valley, Upper Dir
- Coordinates: 35°22′00″N 72°20′47″E
- Lake type: Glacial lake
- Primary inflows: Glacial water
- Basin countries: Pakistan
- Surface elevation: 11,500 ft (3,500 m)

Katora Lake is an alpine glacial lake located in the upper reaches of the Jahaz Banda, Kumrat Valley in the Upper Dir District of the Khyber Pakhtunkhwa province of Pakistan. The lake is fed by the snowmelt from the surrounding glaciers.

== History ==
The word Katora means "bowl" in Pashto. It was named after the lake's resemblance to a bowl.

== See also ==
- Mahodand Lake - Kalam Valley
- Kundol Lake - Kalam Valley
- Daral Lake - Swat Valley
- Lake Saiful Muluk - Kaghan Valley
