= Lake Saiful Muluk =

Mountainous lake in Khyber Pakhtunkhwa, Pakistan

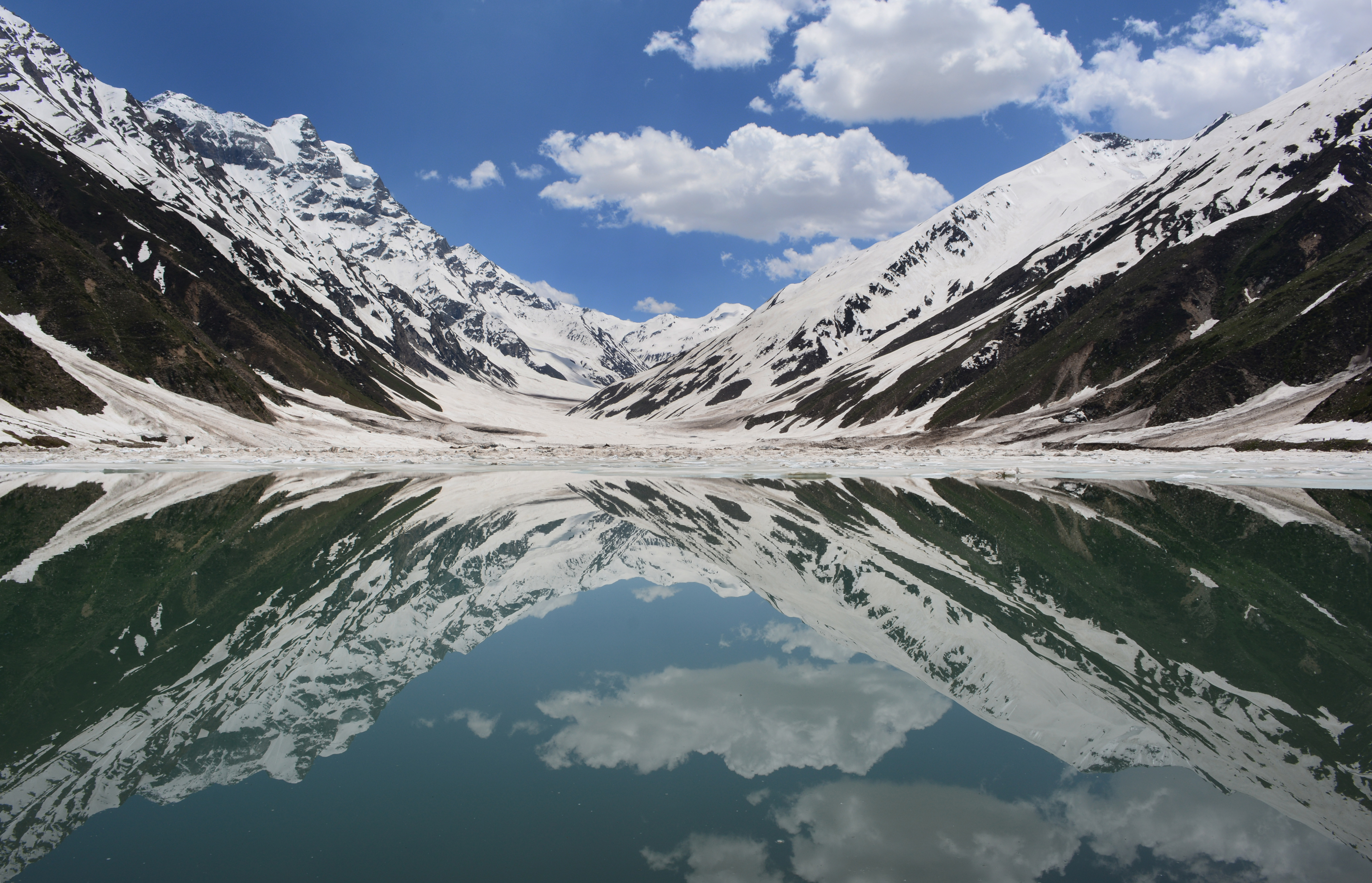
- The lake is notable for its picturesque setting in the mountains of northern Pakistan

- Location within Khyber Pakhtunkhwa Location within Pakistan
- Location: Saiful Muluk National Park, Kaghan Valley, Khyber Pakhtunkhwa, Pakistan
- Coordinates: 34.876957°N 73.694485°E
- Lake type: Alpine, glacial lake
- Primary inflows: Glacial water
- Primary outflows: Stream (a tributary of Kunhar River)
- Basin countries: Pakistan
- Surface area: 2.75 km^{2} (1.06 sq mi)
- Max. depth: 34 metres (112 ft)
- Surface elevation: 3,224 metres (10,577 ft)
- Settlements: Naran

Saiful Muluk (Urdu: جھیل سیف الملوک) is a mountainous lake in northern Pakistan, located at the northern end of the Kaghan Valley, near the town of Naran in the Saiful Muluk National Park. The lake is named after a legendary prince from the folk tale Saiful Muluk, later put into poem form by the Sufi poet Mian Muhammad Bakhsh. At an elevation of 3,224 m (10,578 feet) above sea level, the lake is located above the tree line, and is one of the highest lakes in Pakistan.

== Location ==
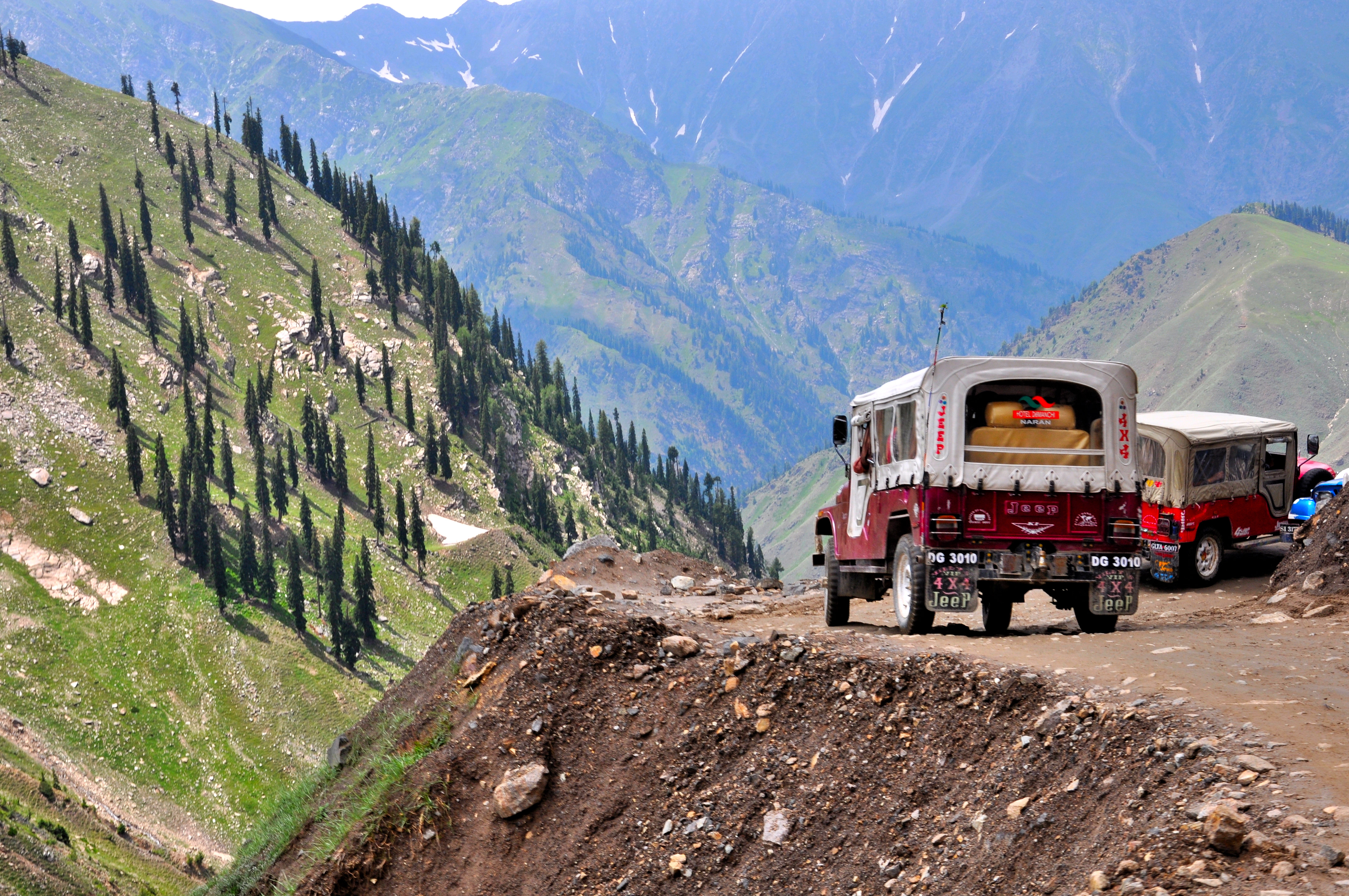
The road to the lake traverses the mountains of the Kaghan Valley

Saiful Muluk is located in the Mansehra District of Khyber Pakhtunkhwa, about 9 kilometres (5.6 mi) north of Naran, in the northern part of the Kaghan Valley. Malika Parbat, the highest peak in the valley is near the lake.

The lake is accessible from the nearby town of Naran during the summer season but access during winter is limited, as heavy snowfall and landslides threaten to cutoff the lake from other regions.

== Physical features ==
Saiful Muluk was formed by glacial moraines that blocked the water of the stream passing through the valley. The Kaghan Valley was formed in the greater Pleistocene Period dating back almost 300,000 years when the area was covered with ice. Rising temperatures and receding glaciers left a large depression where glaciers once stood. Melting water collected into the lake.

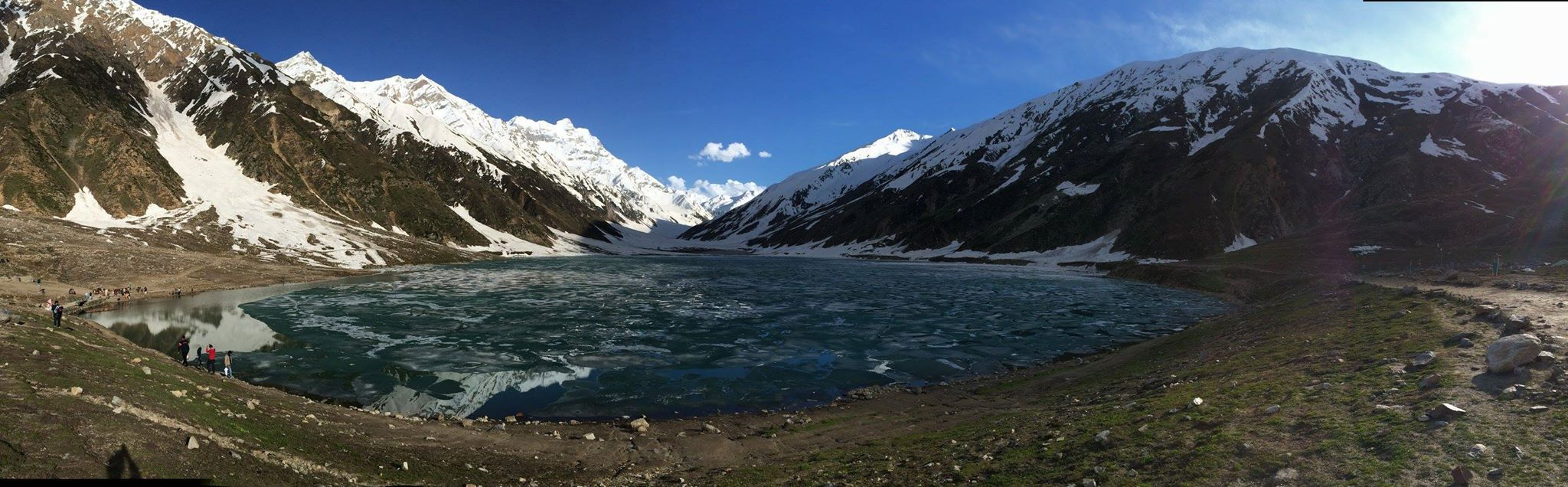
Saiful Muluk panorama in spring

== Ecology ==
The lake has rich eco-diversity and holds many species of blue-green algae. Large brown trout are found in the lake, up to about seven kilograms. About 26 species of vascular plant exist in the area, with Asteraceae the most commonly found species. Other species commonly found in the region are: Ranunculaceae, Compositae, Cruciferae, Gramineae, Apiaceae, Leguminosae, Scrophulariaceae and Polygonaceae.

== Folklore ==
The Lake Saiful Muluk is named after a legendary prince from the tale titled Saiful Muluk, later on put into poem form by the Sufi poet Mian Muhammad Bakhsh. It tells the story of the Egyptian Prince Saiful Malook who fell in love with a fairy princess named Princess Badi ul-Jamal at the lake.

The Story of Prince Saiful Maluk (Arabic: قِصَّة سَيْف الْمُلُوْك وَبَدِيْع الْجَمَال, romanized: Qiṣat Saif al-Mulūk wa Badīʿ al-Jamāl) is an Arabic fable, a story of love between a prince and a fairy. It is considered a later addition to the One Thousand and One Nights collection of Arabic fables, and manuscripts of the story are dated to the 17th century. In South Asia, the story was put into Punjabi verse by 19th-century poet and mystic Mian Muhammad Bakhsh. It has also been retold in numerous languages such as Balochi, Bengali, English, Urdu and Punjabi. Similarly, according to Turkish scholarship, the narrative is "widely known" in Turkey, Azerbaijan, Tatarstan, Turkmenistan, Kazakhstan, Taranchi, and Bashkortostan.

According to the folklore, Saiful Maluk (whose name means 'Sword of the Kings') was a prince of Egypt. He had significant wealth which he had inherited from his forefathers. The treasure bore two seals: one depicting Saiful Maluk and the other depicting Badi-ul-Jamala (also rendered as Bediülcemal). One night, Prince Saiful Maluk saw in a dream a lake and a fairy. He got up and went to tell his dream to his father, asking him about the place and the fairy. His father told him that he can't meet the fairy as she isn't human, unlike him. However, the longer the prince recollected his dream, the more he was overwhelmed with love for the fairy.

== Gallery ==
Hover the mouse click or tap on the following images to see their captions.

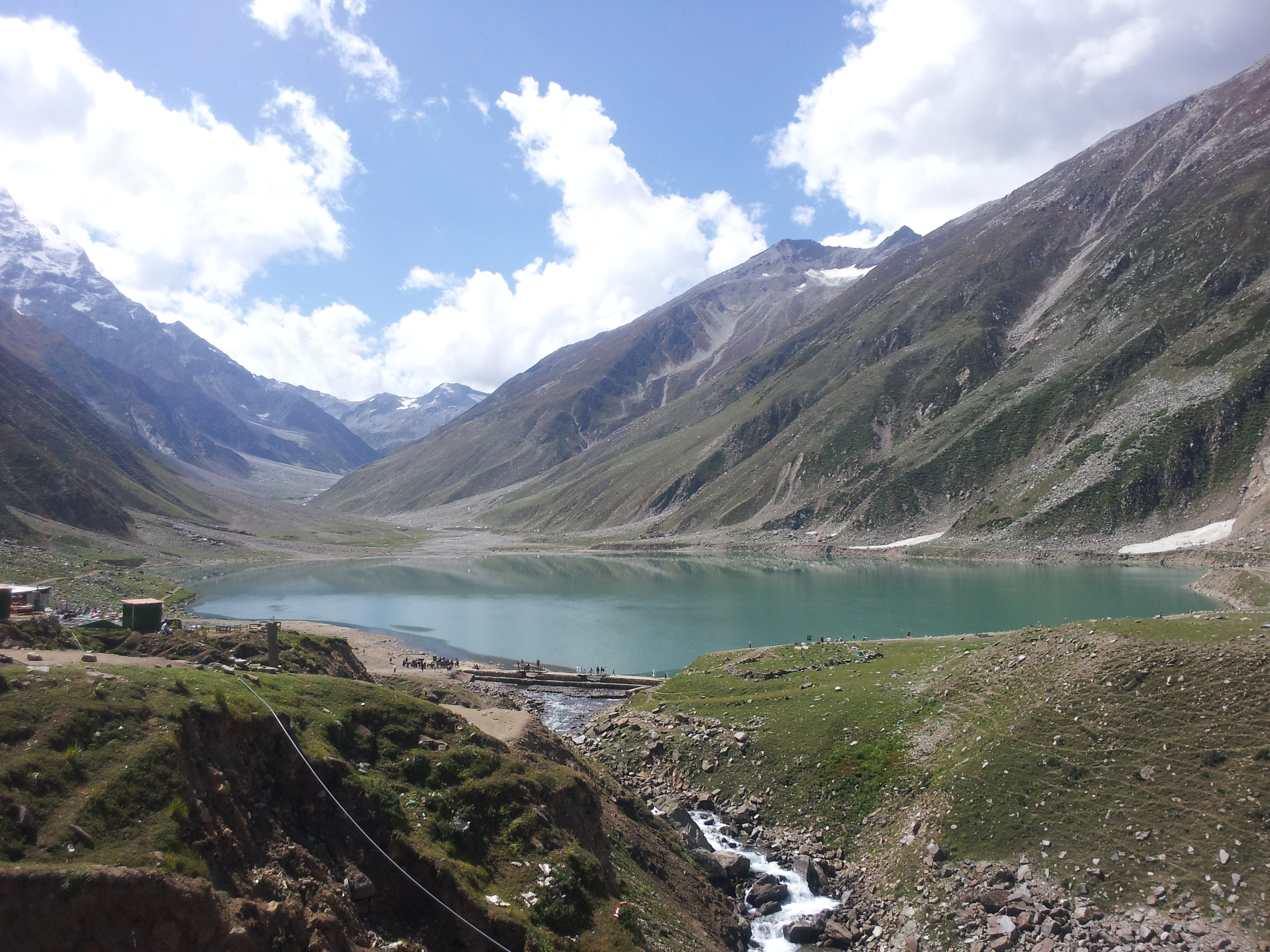
Lake Saiful Muluk under clouds

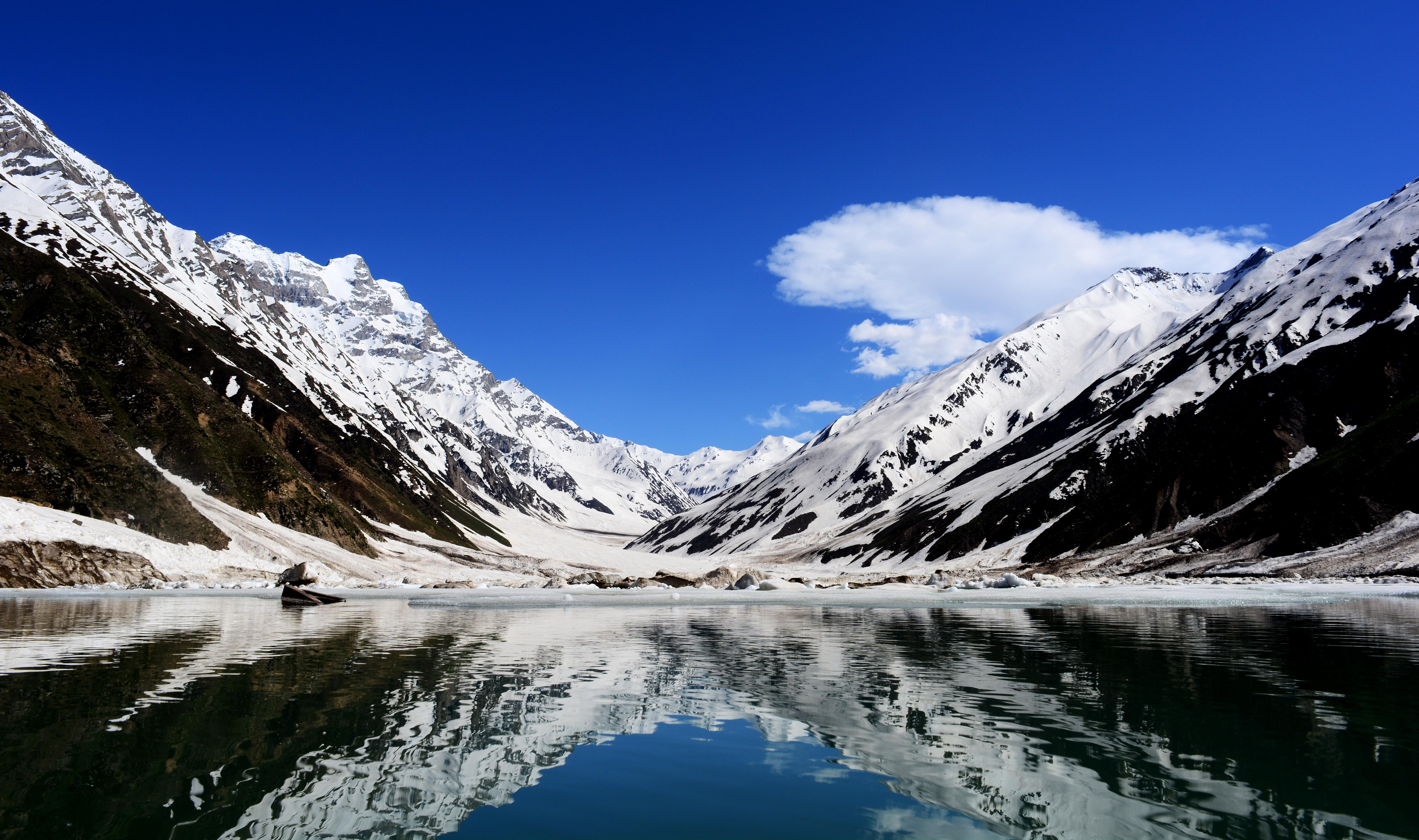
A view of lake in Wortez

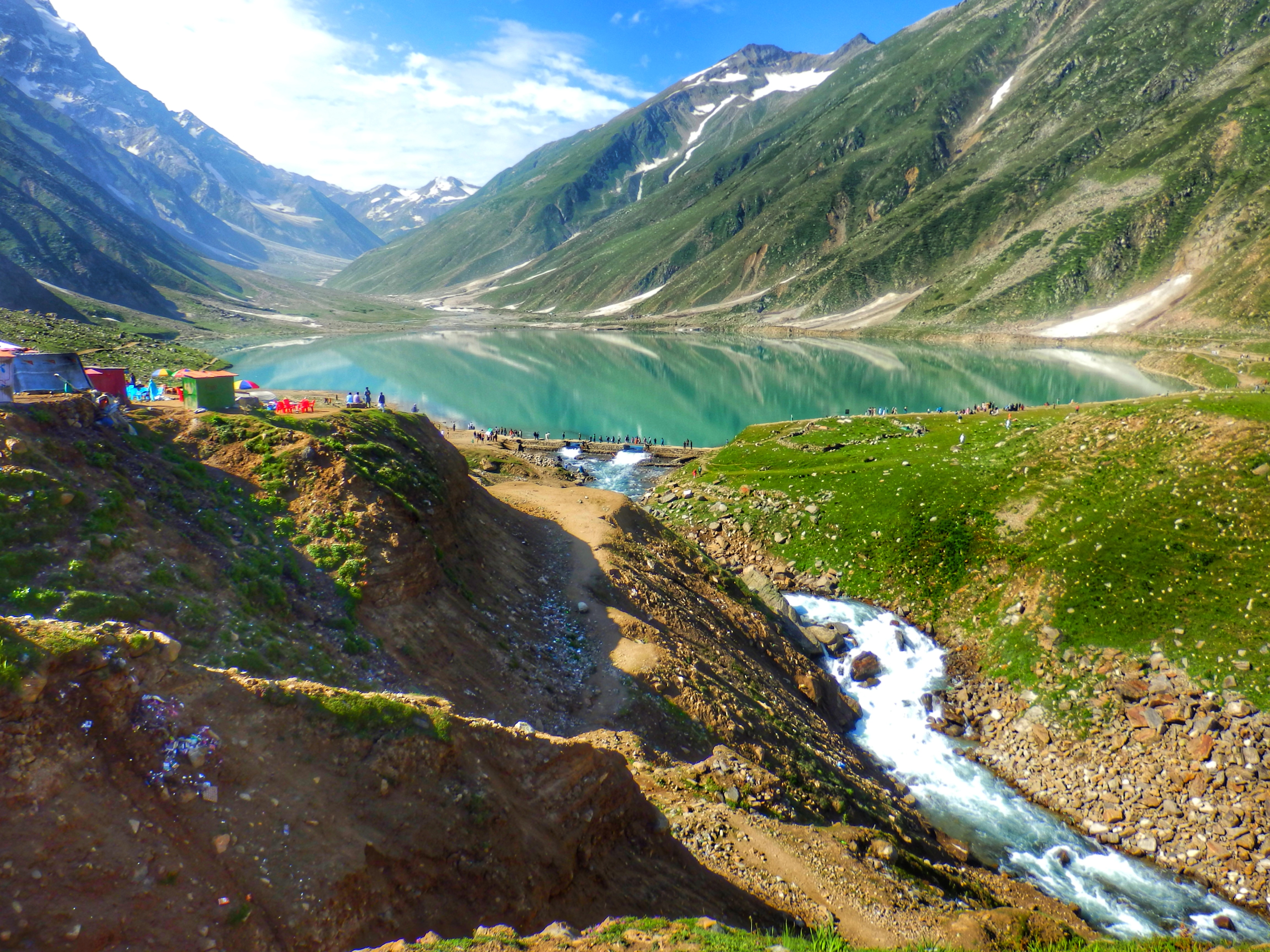
Lake Saiful Muluk in a sunny day

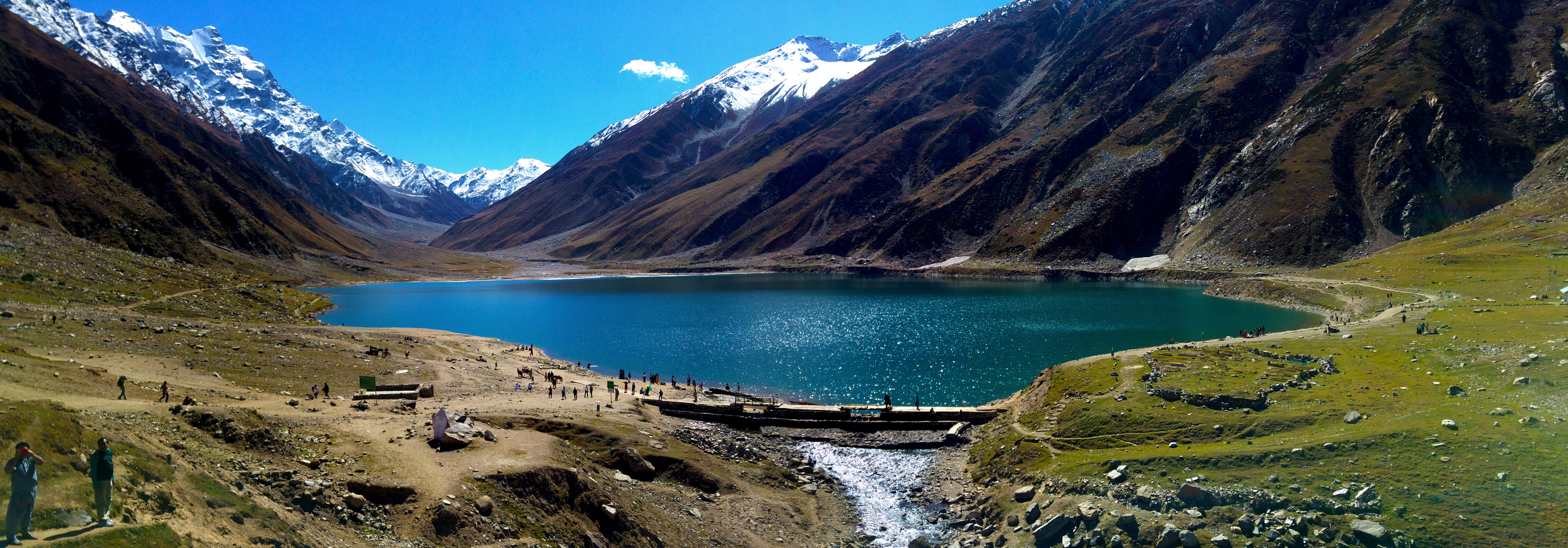
A full view of Lake Saif-ul-Muluk

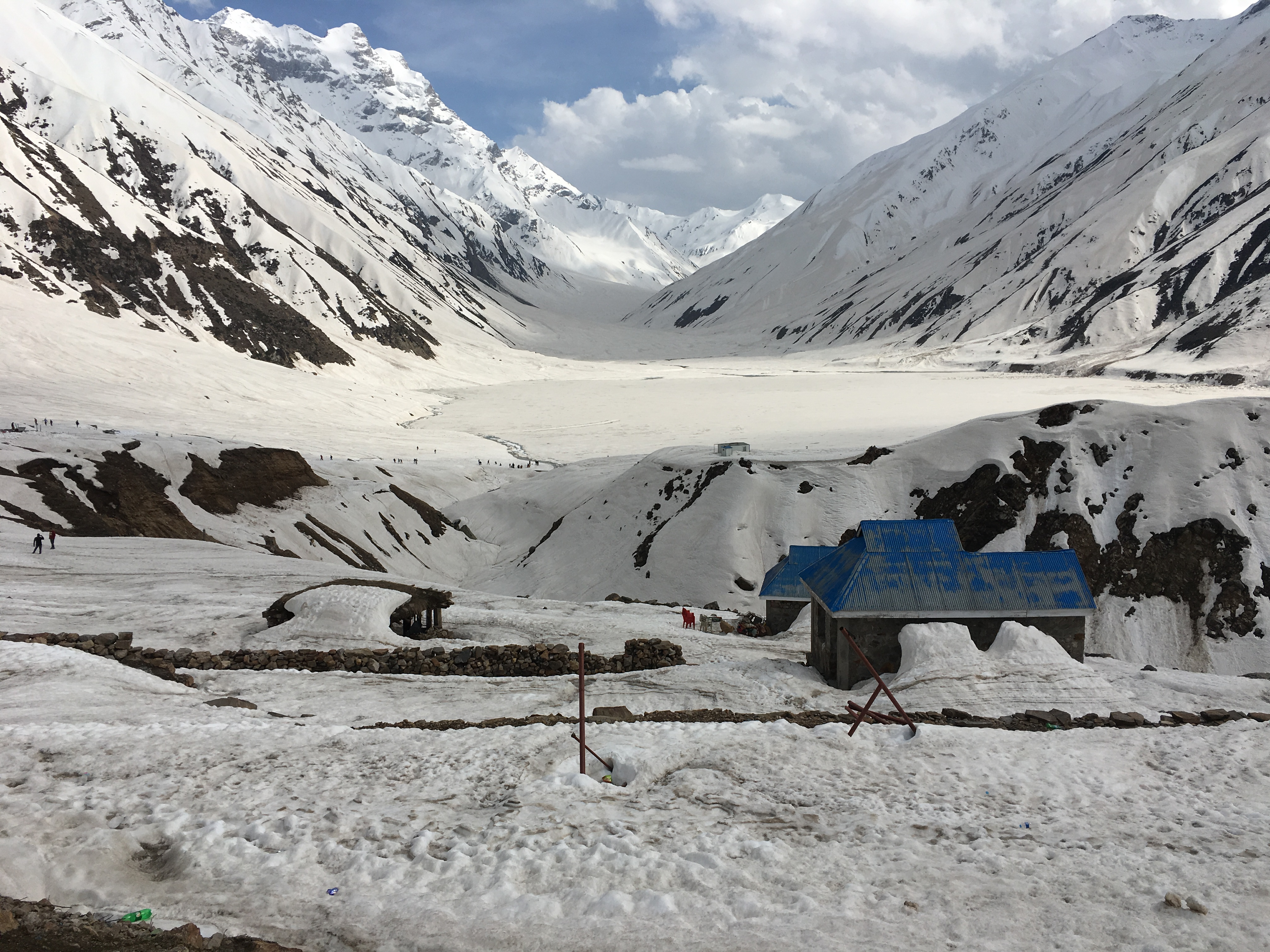
Lake Saif ul Malook in May 2017

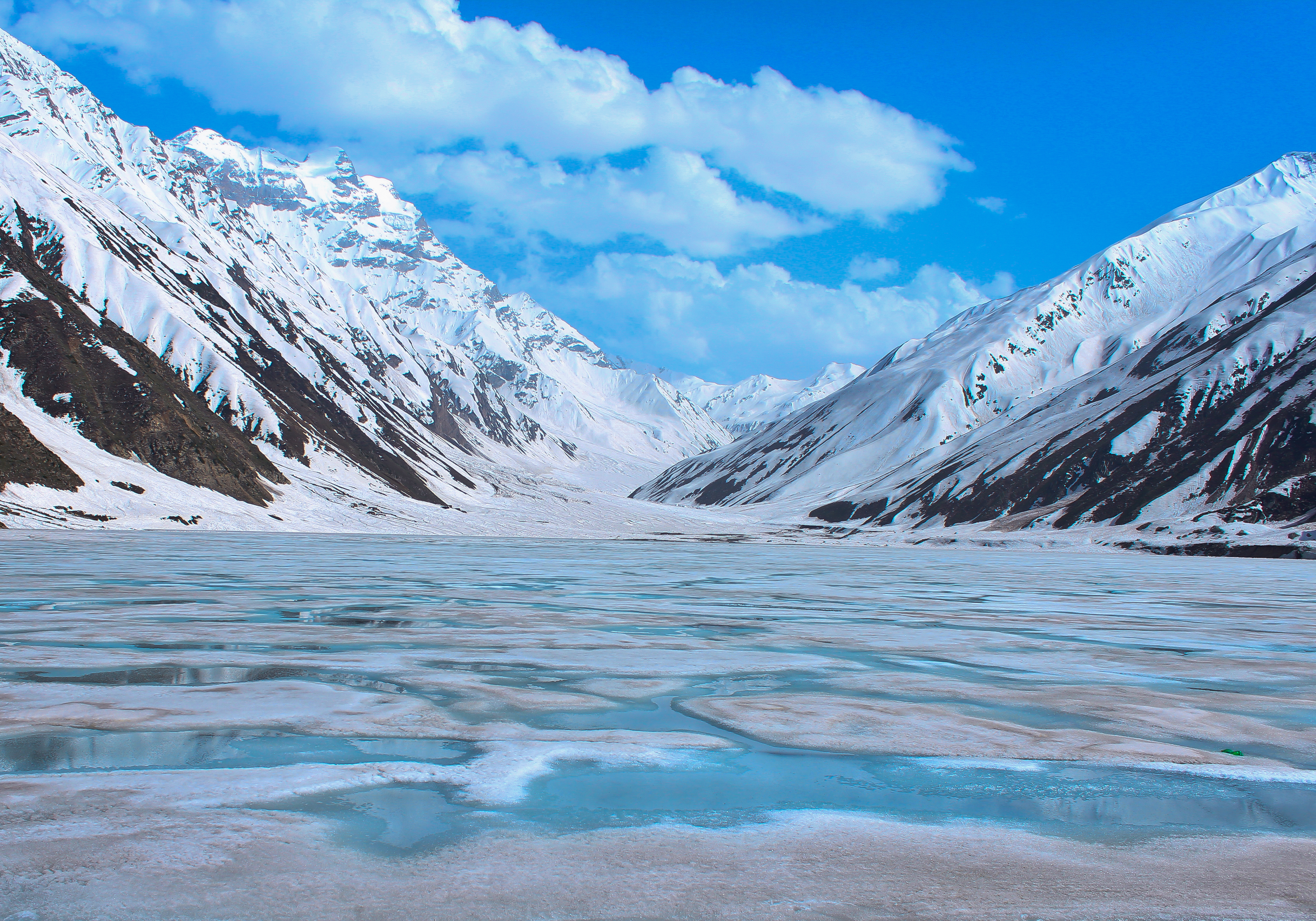
The lake freezes over in winter

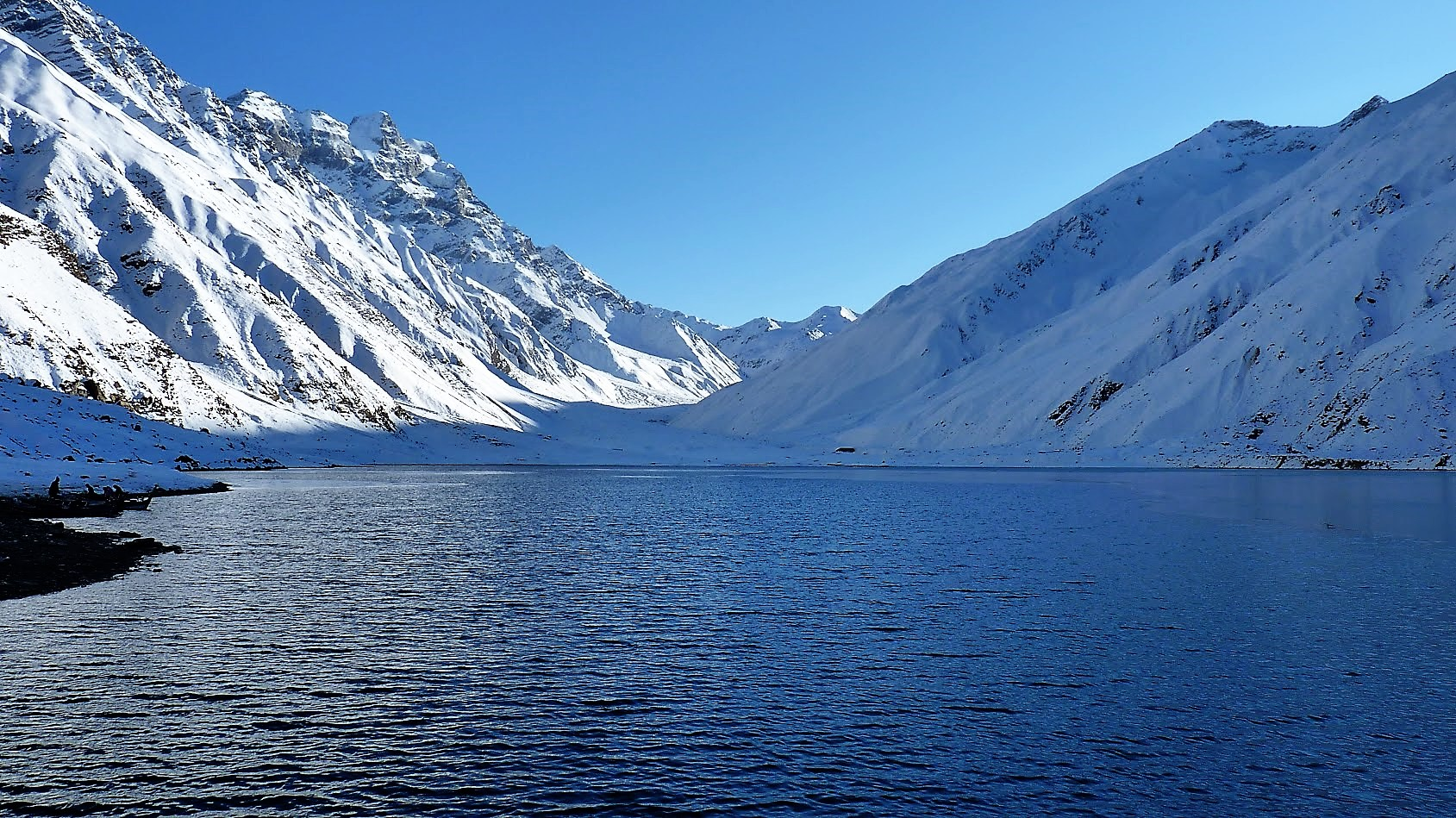
Lake Saif ul Muluk in December 2012

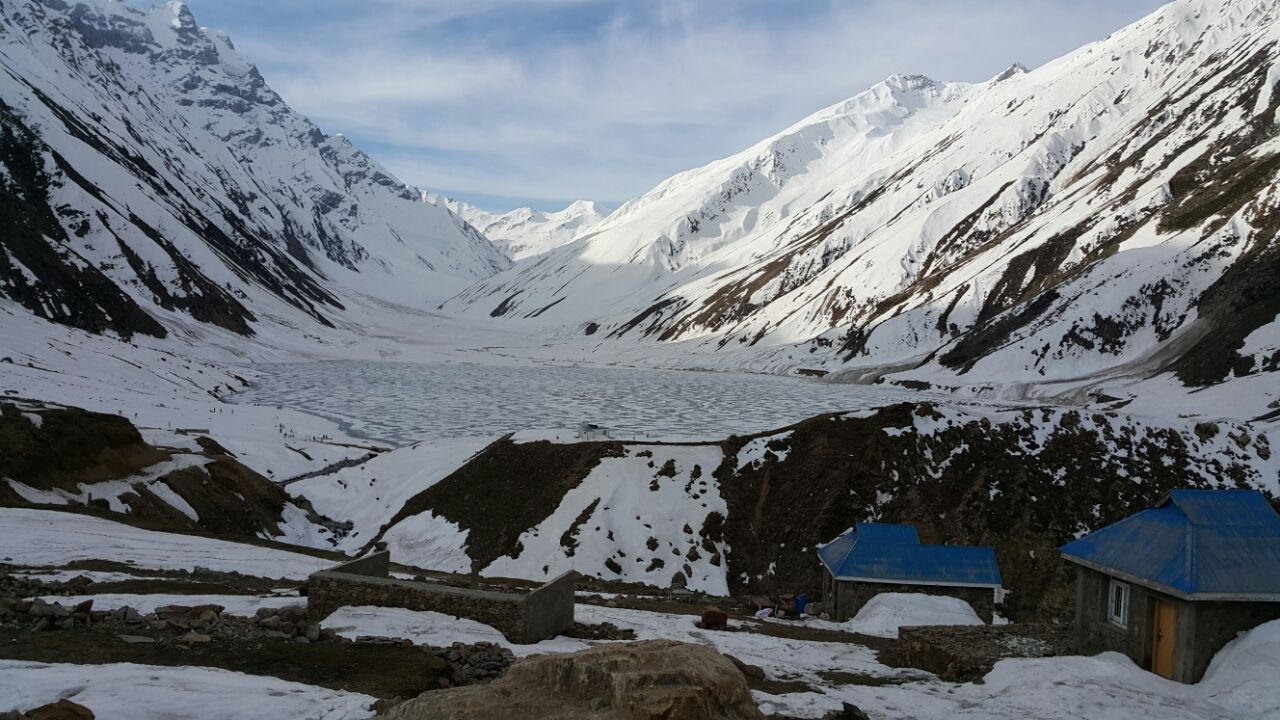
Tourist point with Lake

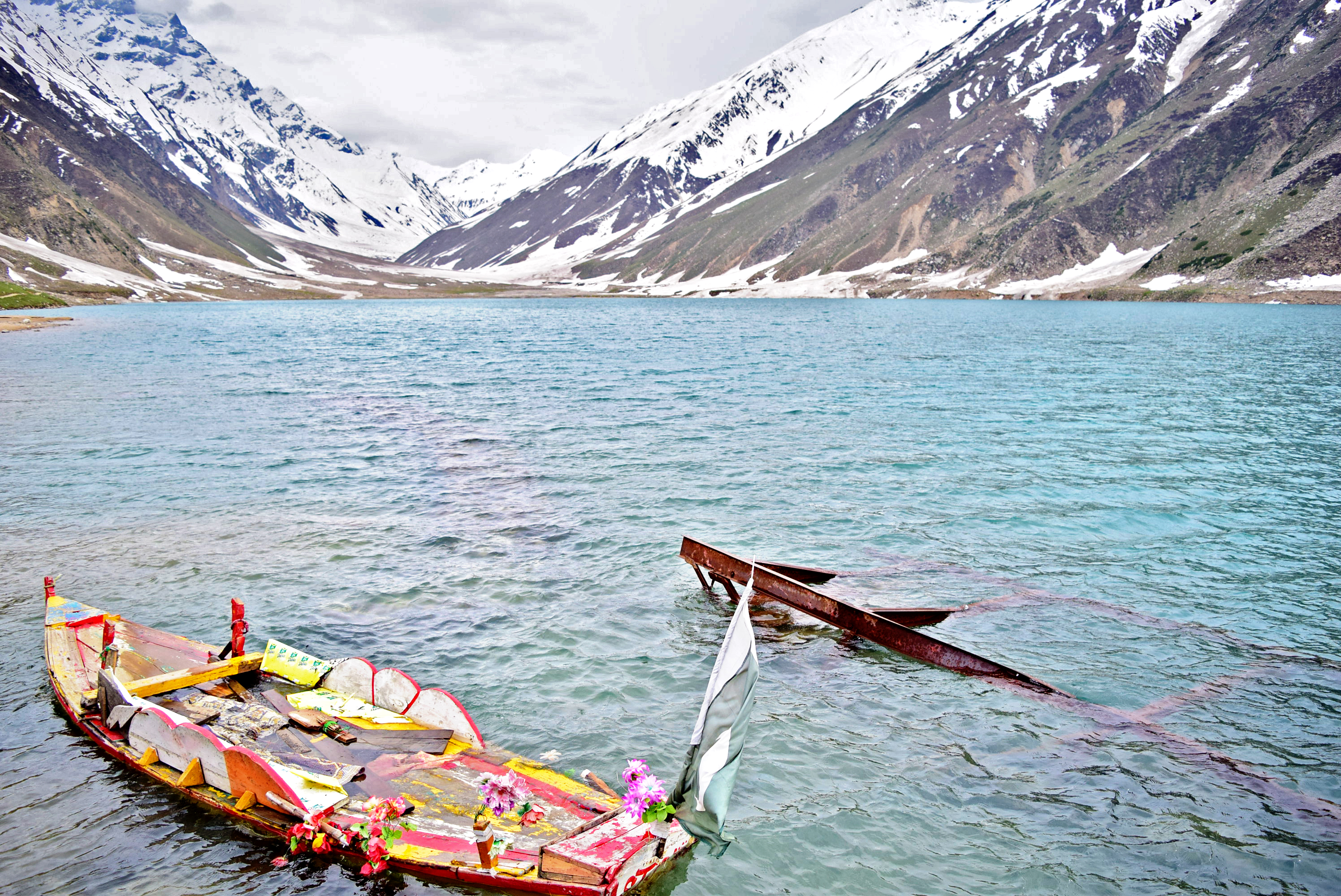
A boat in Saiful Maluk Lake

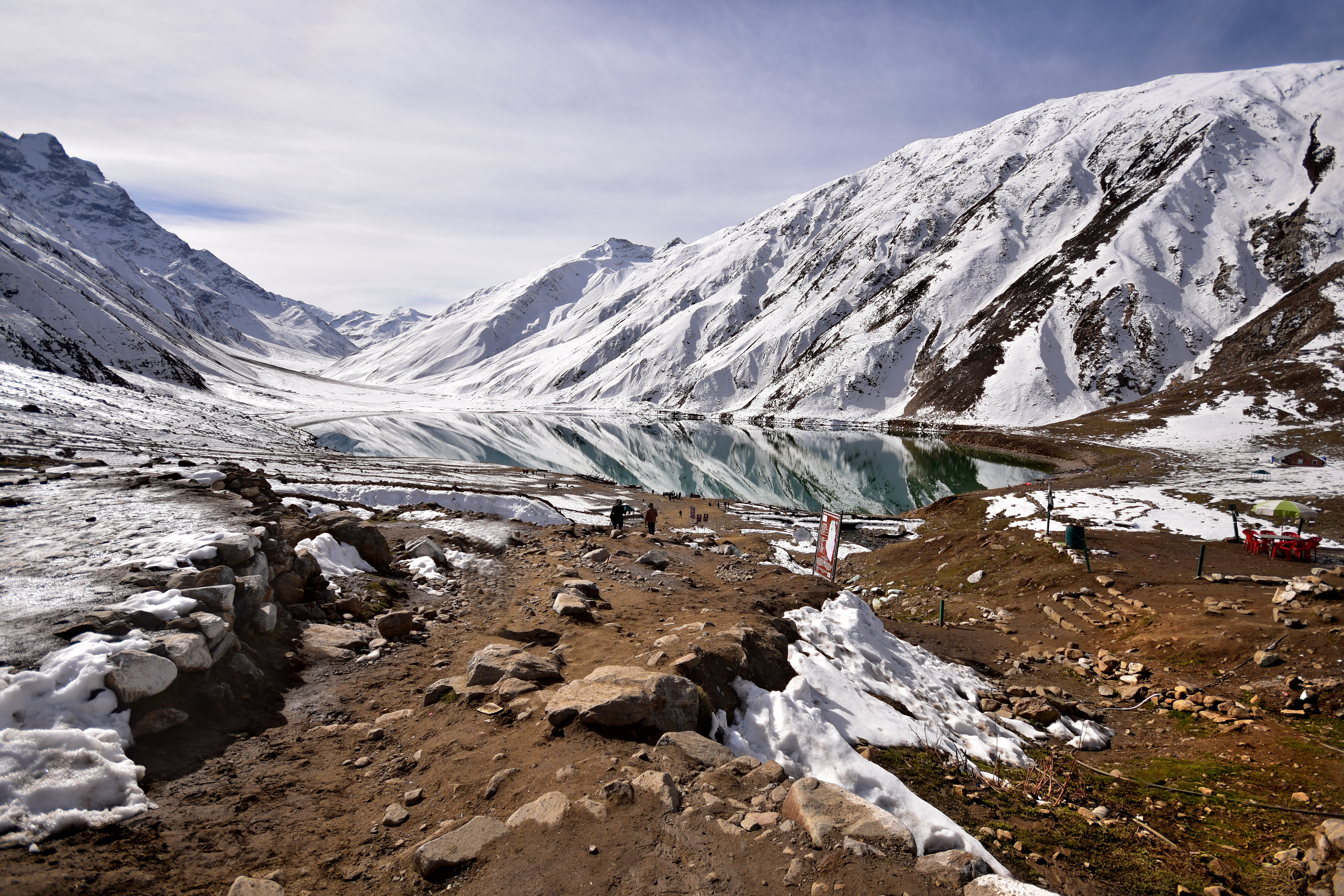
Lake Saif-Ul-Mulook, Kaghan Valley, Pakistan

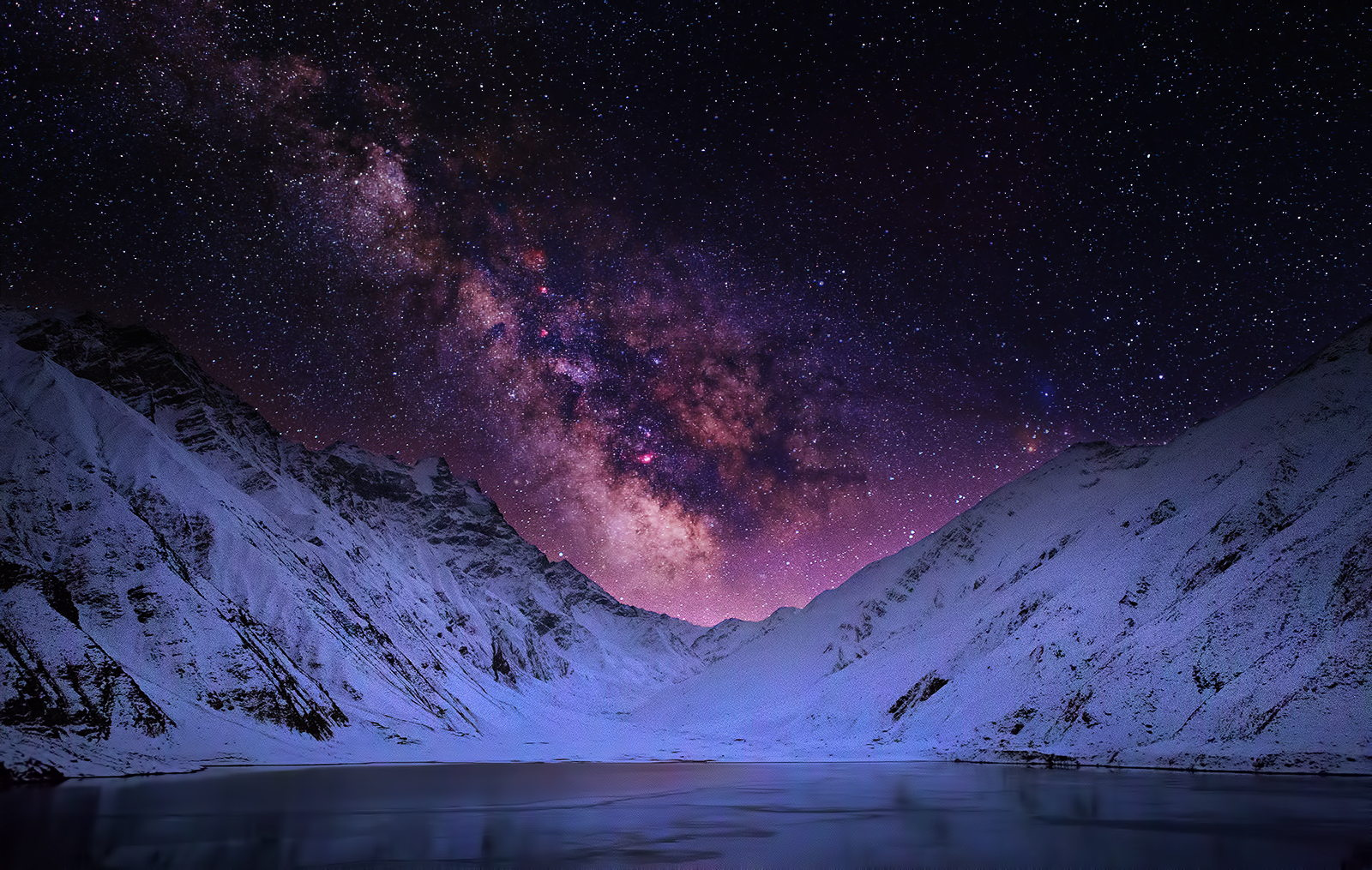
Lake Saif-Ul-Mulook at night

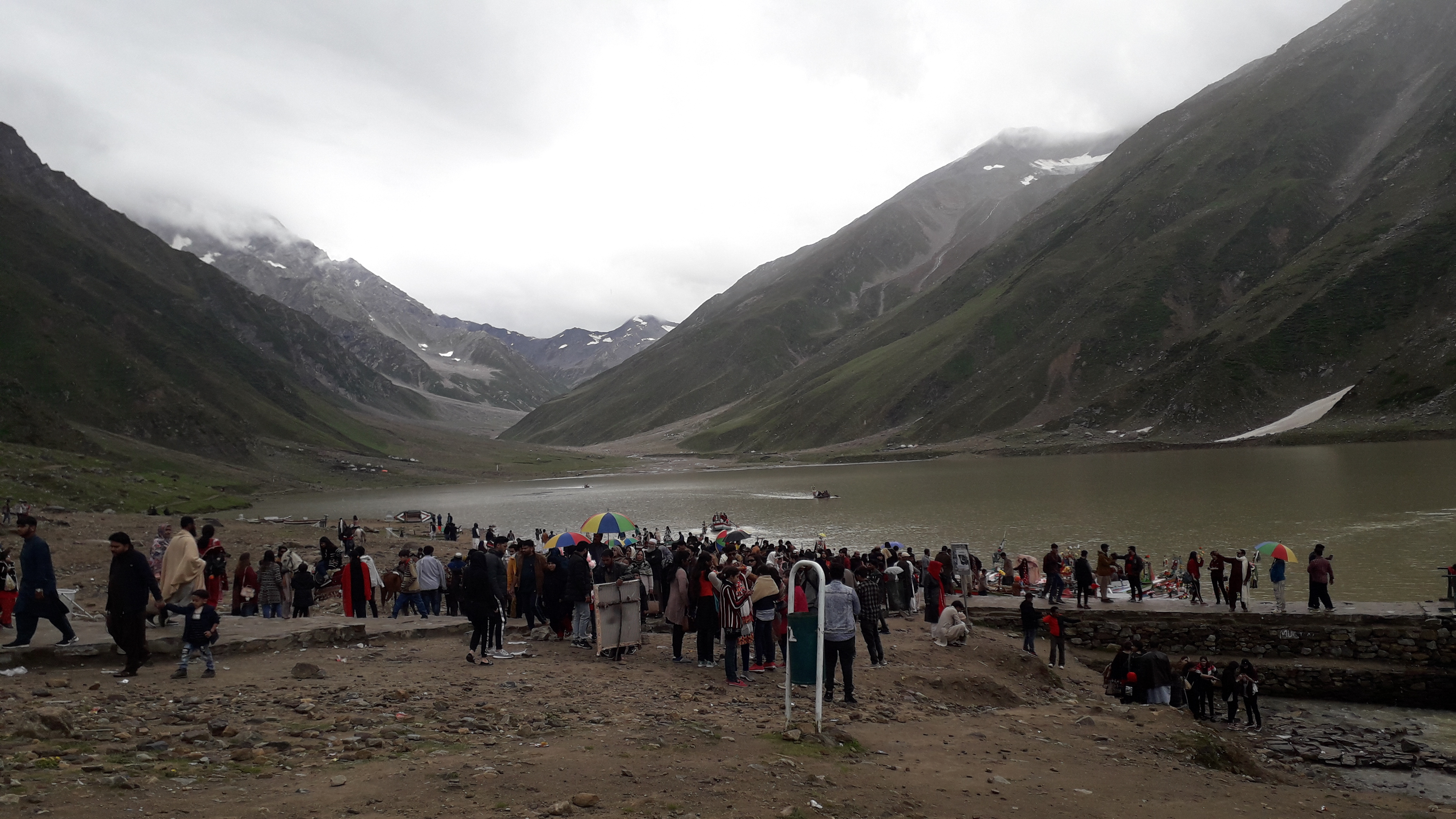
Lake Saiful Malook Pakistan

== See also ==
- Lulusar Lake
- Katora Lake
- Dudipatsar Lake
- Mahodand Lake
- Ratti Gali Lake
