= Daral Lake =

- درال جھیل (Urdu)
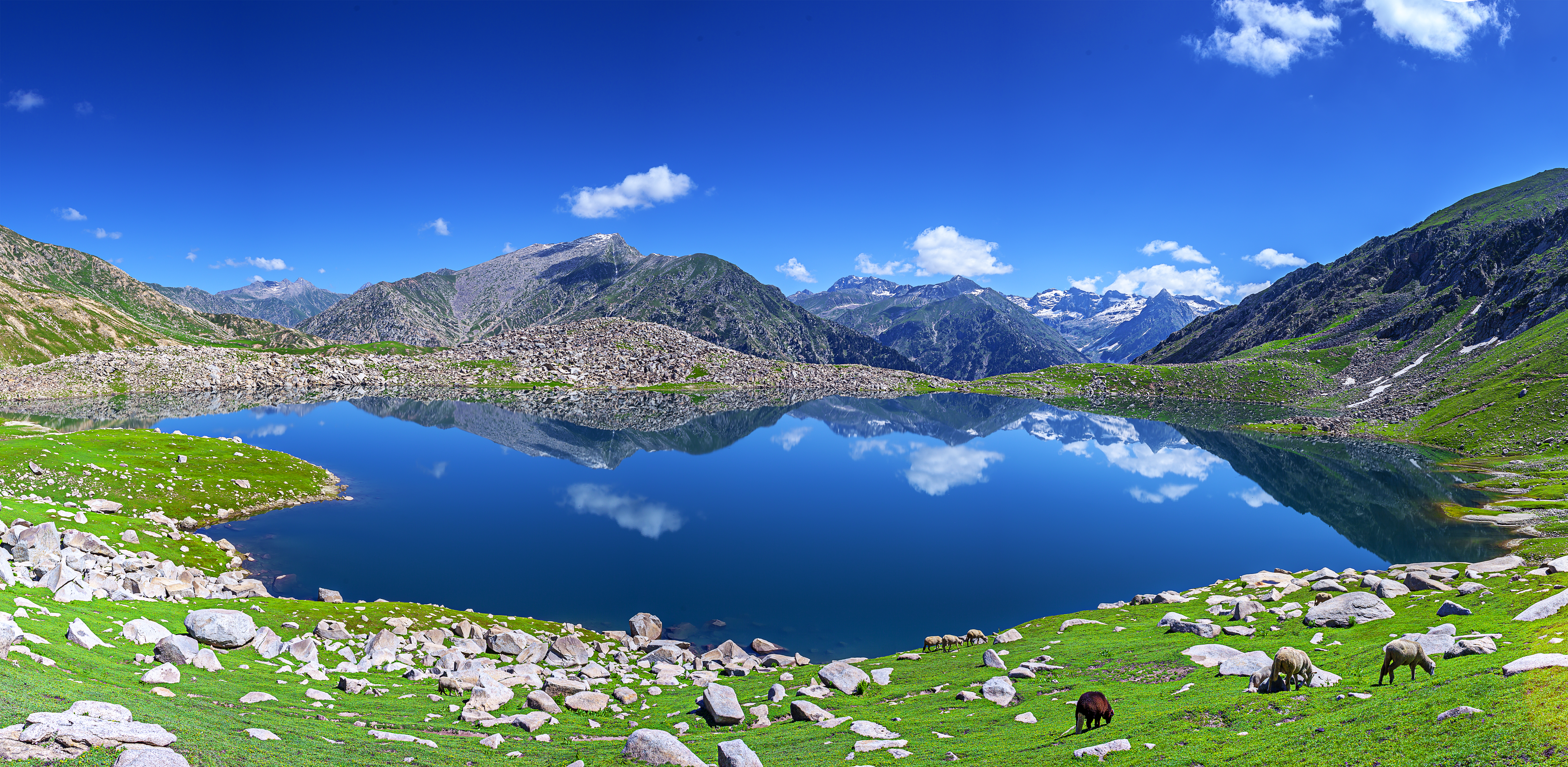
- Daral Lake, Bahrain, Swat Valley

- Location within Khyber Pakhtunkhwa
- Location: Bahrain, Swat Valley
- Coordinates: 35.217°N 72.375°E
- Lake type: Alpine/Glacial lake
- Primary inflows: Glacial water
- Primary outflows: Daral khwar
- Basin countries: Pakistan
- Surface elevation: 3,505.2 m (11,500 ft)
- Settlements: Bahrain Town

Daral Lake (Urdu: درال جھیل) is an alpine lake within the Swat Kohistan region of the Swat Valley in the Khyber Pakhtunkhwa province of Pakistan. It is situated to the northeast of Saidgai Lake. "Daral" is a Dardic word and literally means "stream" or "spring water".

The lake appears as a giant amoeba in shape. Near the lake, there is an ancient mosque where shepherds and visitors offer their prayers and use it as a resting place for the night.

== Location and physical features ==
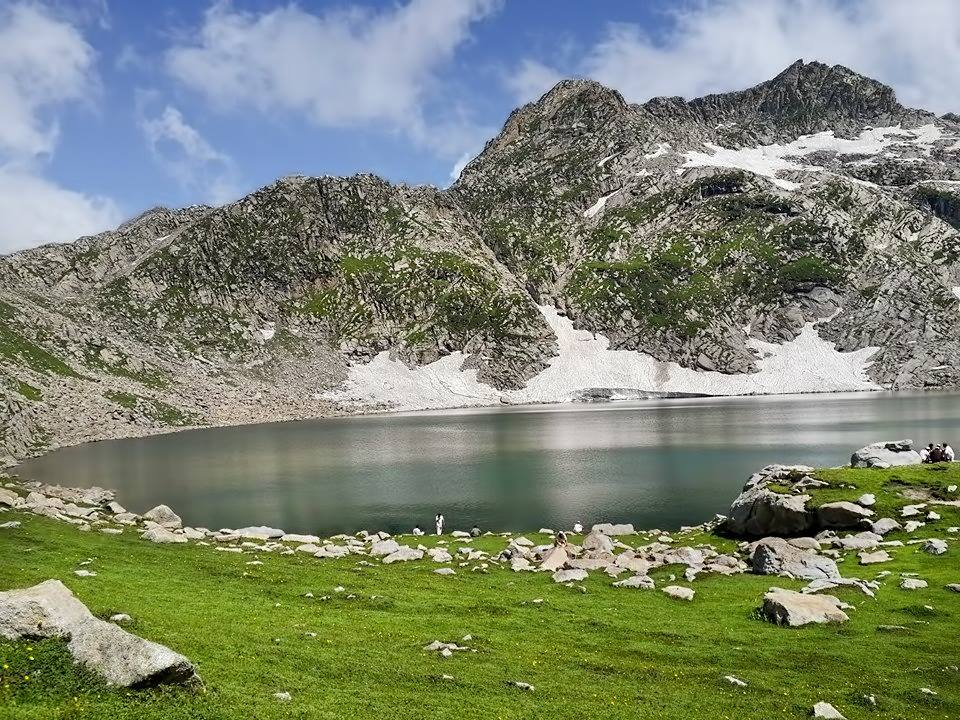
Daral Lake, Bahrain

Daral Dand is situated in the western upper reaches of Bahrain, in the foothills of Spinsar Mountain and to the northeast of Saidgai Dand at an elevation of 3,505.2 m (11,500 ft). The lake is fed by melting glaciers of the surrounding mountains and gives rise to Daral Khwar which is the main left tributary of Swat River.

== Access ==
Daral Lake is accessible only during the summer; during the winter, the trails which lead to the lake, are closed due to heavy snowfall. While in summer, it can be accessed from Bahrain in three to four hours of trekking on bare mountains, after which the trek descends down towards the east where Daral Lake is located. Alternatively, it can be approached from Gabina Jabba hill top, the most favoured trail. An unmetalled-cum-jeepable road ends at Gabina Jabba where the trekking journey begins. From here, continuous trekking for almost 4–5 hours leads to the lake.

== See also ==
- Lake Saiful Muluk - Kaghan Valley
- Dudipatsar Lake - Kaghan Valley
- Saidgai Lake - Swat Valley
- Mahodand Lake - Kalam Valley
- Kundol Lake - Kalam Valley
