= Kundol Lake =

Lake in Swat Valley, Pakistan

- کنڈول جھیل (Urdu)
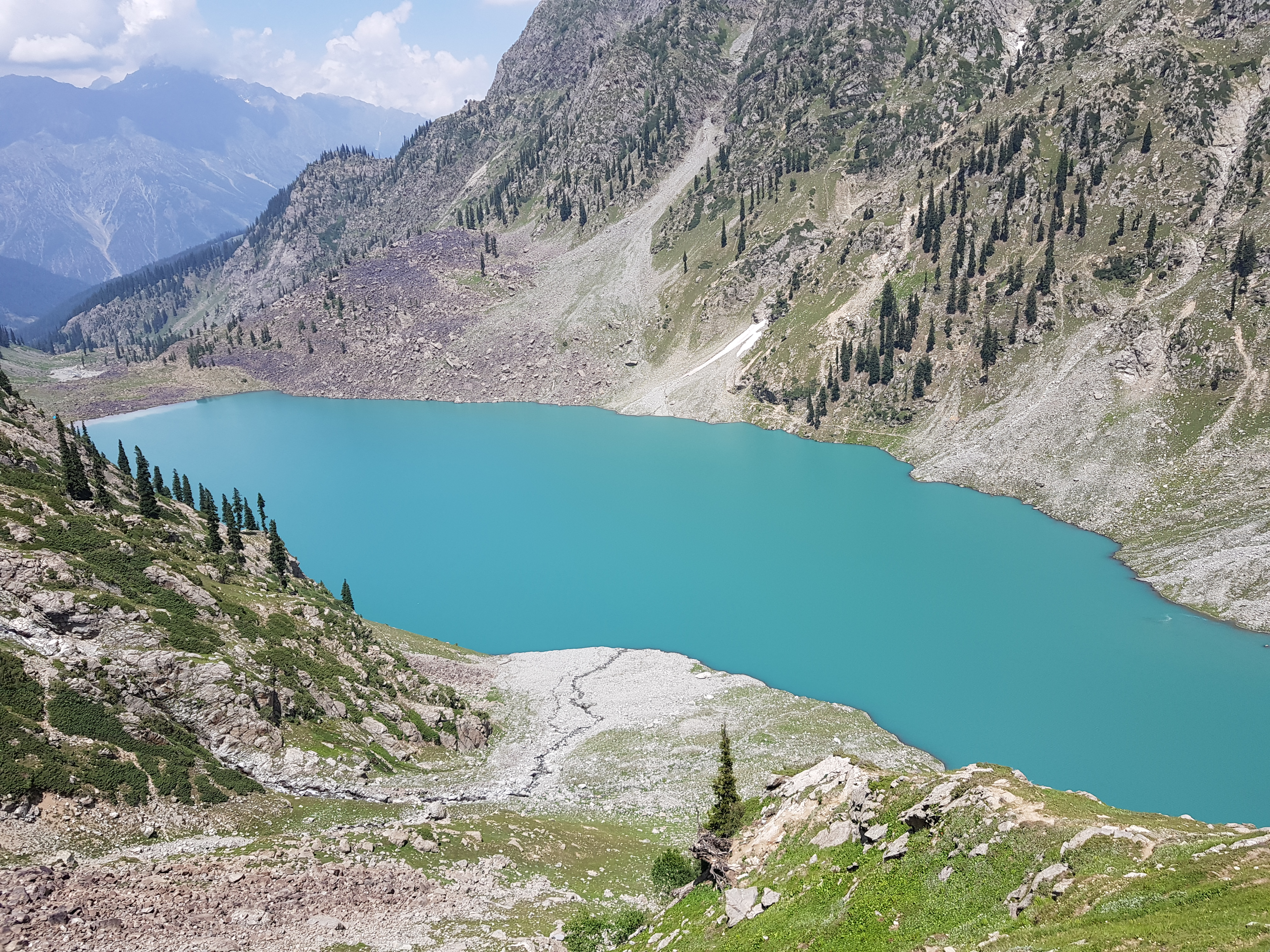
- Kundol Lake, Swat Valley

- Location within Khyber Pakhtunkhwa Location within Pakistan
- Location: Utror Valley, Swat Valley
- Coordinates: 35.419°N 72.433°E
- Lake type: Glacial lake
- Primary inflows: Glaciers water
- Primary outflows: Utror stream
- Basin countries: Pakistan
- Max. length: 1.5 km (0.93 mi)
- Max. width: approx 1 km (0.62 mi)
- Surface elevation: 3,032.7 m (9,950 ft)
- Settlements: Utror, Kalam

Kundol Lake (Urdu: کنڈول جھیل), also known as Kundol Dand and Kundal, is a lake in the Swat Valley of Khyber Pakhtunkhwa, Pakistan. It is located in the north of the Utror Valley. It is 19 kilometres (12 mi) away from the Kalam Valley.

A popular folktale surrounds the lake, claiming that every month, a golden bowl materializes at its center, shimmering like the moon. Yet, its enchanted nature has prevented anyone from laying hands upon it. The vicinity of Kundol Lake boasts numerous stunning attractions, including the Spinkhor Waterfall, Loypanghalay Lake, Desan Meadows, Katora Lake, Jaaz Banda, and Gabeen Lake.

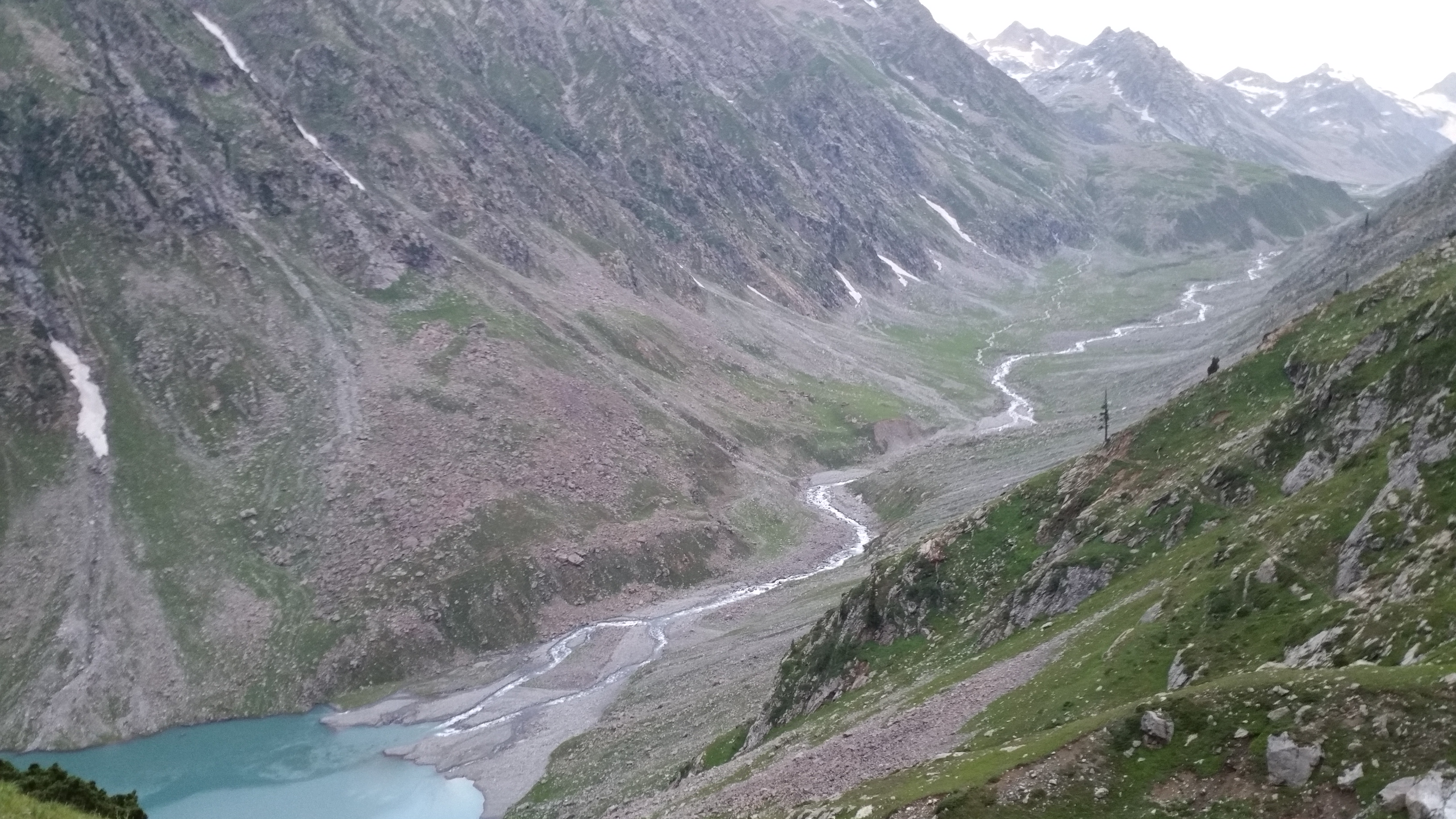
Kundol Lake Water Entrance

== Location and trail to the lake ==
Kundol Lake lies in the lap of Hindu Kush mountains at an elevation of (9,950 ft), in the north of Utror, encompassed by snow-clad mountains and towering trees. The trail to the lake from Ladu is easy to follow as a large stream flows downwards from the lake, which merges with River Swat in the Kalam Valley. The trail follows the stream and passes by forests and waterfalls. The mountains around the lake are covered by a thick blanket of vegetation. The banks of Kundol Lake serve as a camping site during the summer season for the trekkers.

Kundol Lake is fed by melting glaciers and springs of the Hindu Kush. It gives rise to utror Khwar, the major right tributary of the Swat River.

== Access ==
Kundol Lake is accessible only during summer. During winter, the roads are closed due to heavy snowfall. It can be accessed by an unpaved road from Kalam up to Utror in a four-wheel automotive where a link road ends in a green valley called Ladu in the foothills of the mountain. From Ladu it takes almost four to six hours to reach the lake. The mountains around this small valley are covered with tall cedar and pine trees.

== See also ==
- Lake Saiful Muluk - Kaghan Valley
- Dudipatsar Lake - Kaghan Valley
- Katora Lake - Kumrat Valley
- Mahodand Lake - Kalam Valley
- Daral Lake - Swat Valley
- List of lakes in Pakistan
