= Tourist city =

Settlement whose main or major industry is tourism

A tourist city is a place where a substantial share of economic activity is attributable to tourism-related consumption, and a large part of the city consists of areas dedicated to visitors.

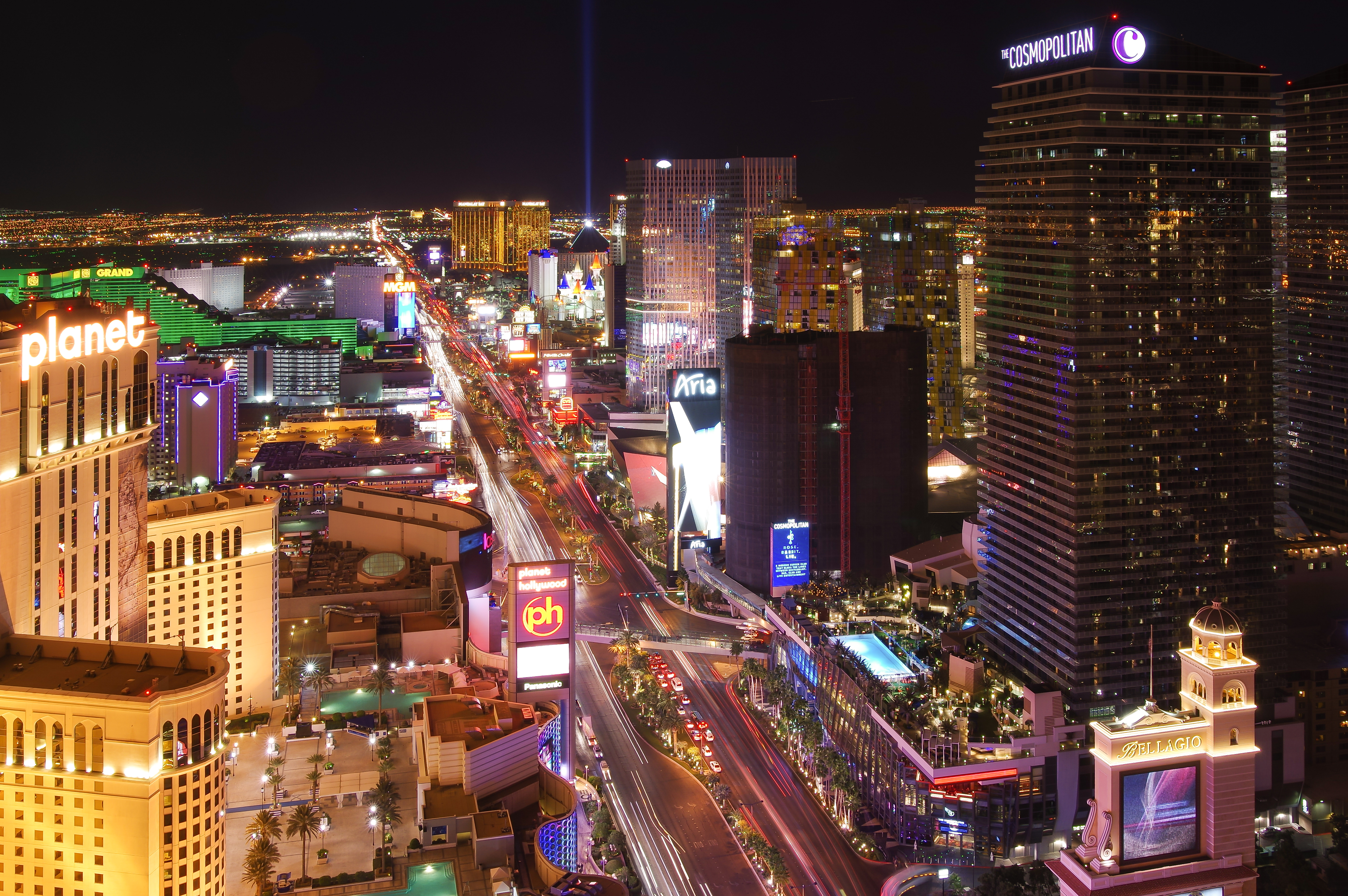
Las Vegas, Nevada, an example of a tourist city in America

Some cities, such as New York City, Singapore, London, or Paris are not exclusively tourist cities, but do have tourist districts or historical quarters and are well known for their reputation as having a lot of international tourists.

A tourist city differs from a regular city in the sense that it is trying to appeal to everyone who is not native to that area. This causes there to be a lot of advertising and attractions to try to draw people to the city.

To regulate tourism, tourist cities also establish regions designed specifically for visitors on vacation. One example of this would be Cancún and its isolated Hotel Zone.

== Examples of notable tourist cities ==
Data from Euromonitor.

- Macao (China)
- Dubai (UAE)
- Antalya (Türkiye)
- Phuket (Thailand)
- Pattaya (Thailand)
- Mecca (Saudi Arabia)
- Medina (Saudi Arabia)
- Agra (India)
- Denpasar, known under Bali (Indonesia)
- Barcelona (Spain)
- Las Vegas (United States)
- Cancun (Mexico)
- Orlando (United States)
- Venice (Italy)
- Hạ Long (Vietnam)
- Zhuhai (China)
- Hurghada (Egypt)
- Punta Cana (Dominican Republic)
- Muğla (Türkiye)
- Sharm El Sheikh (Egypt)

- Batumi (Georgia)

== See also ==
- List of cities by international visitors - cities ranked by number of visitors in a year
- Honeypot (tourism)
- Resort town
