= Tourism in the United Kingdom =

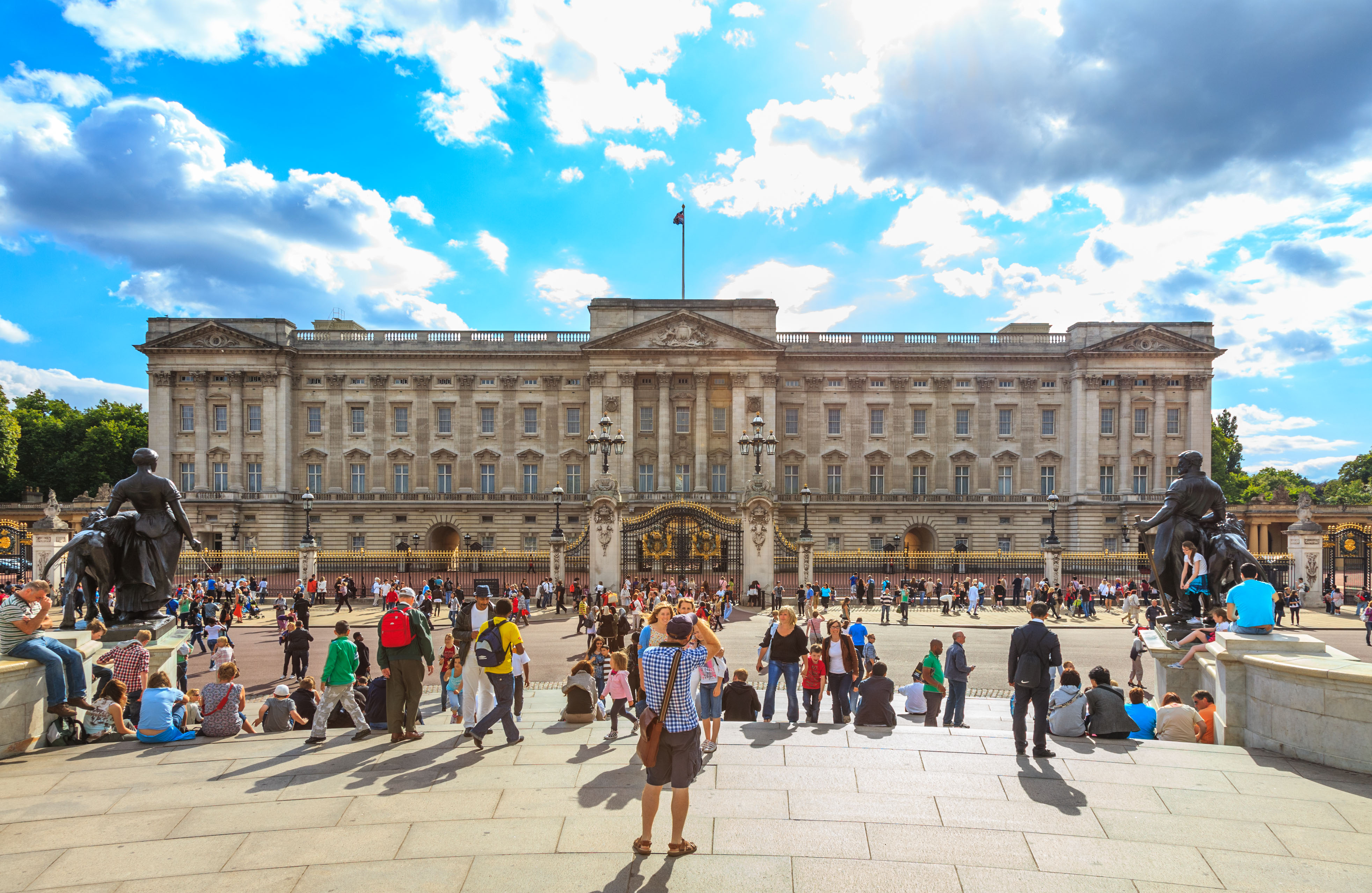
Tourists at Buckingham Palace

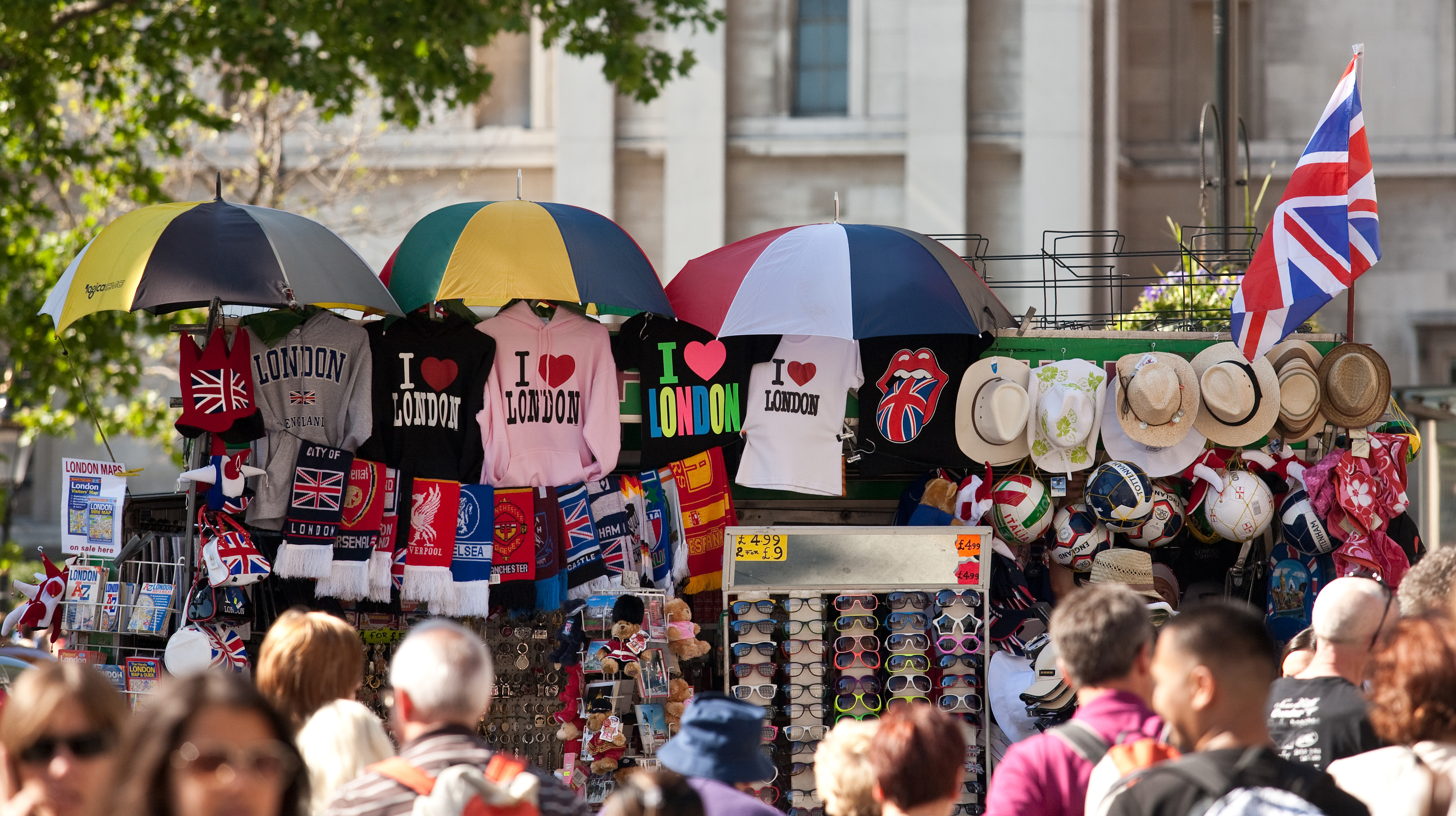
A tourist stall selling various London and United Kingdom related souvenirs on the edge of Trafalgar Square on the Strand

Tourism in the United Kingdom is a major industry and contributor to the UK economy, which is the world's 7th biggest tourist destination, with over 40.1 million visiting in 2019, contributing a total of £234 billion to the GDP.

£23.1 billion was spent in the UK by foreign tourists in 2017. VisitBritain data shows that the United States remains the most valuable inbound market, with American visitors spending £2.1 billion in 2010. Nevertheless, the number of travellers originating from Europe is much larger than those travelling from North America: 21.5 million compared to 3.5 million American/Canadian visitors.

The country's principal tourist destinations are London, Edinburgh, Oxford, Cambridge, York, and Canterbury. The United Kingdom hosts a total of 33 World Heritage sites, the 8th most in the world. The Lonely Planet travel guide voted England number 2, after Bhutan, as one of the best countries to visit in 2020. Some of the most popular cities include London, Edinburgh and Manchester and notable attractions include the Palace of Westminster, the London Eye and Edinburgh Castle.

== History ==
The World Heritage Sites of the United Kingdom: cultural sites marked red, natural sites marked green, mixed site (St Kilda) marked blue. Names are abridged to fit on the map. Greater London is home to the cultural sites of Maritime Greenwich, Royal Botanical Gardens, Kew, Tower of London, and Palace of Westminster and Westminster Abbey including Saint Margaret's Church.

Tourism first began to increase during the 17th century when wealthy Europeans would follow the ‘Grand Tour’ of Western Europe which traditionally started in the United Kingdom before travelling to Italy. Throughout the Industrial Revolution, tourism continued to spike as people began to have more disposable income and technological advancements made transport more convenient and affordable. In 1841, Thomas Cook, founder of Thomas Cook & Son, took 500 passengers by train on a return trip from Leicester to Loughborough. This was his first excursion and is seen as a significant milestone in the creation of the British tourism industry.

The world wars dampened the growth of the tourism sector, although after World War II the government began putting measures in place to increase tourism, recognising its political and economic influence. By 1987, the World Tourism Organization estimated 3.4% of the UK's GDP came from tourism. More recently, budget airlines and cheap accommodation has caused almost continuous year-on-year growth. In more recent times, terrorist attacks in the UK such as the 7/7 bombings in 2005 have an expected negative impact on the tourism industry. The 2008 financial crisis led to three consecutive years of the number of visitors from overseas decreasing for the only period between 2002 and 2017.

The United Kingdom is the 10th most visited country in the world and the 6th most visited country in Europe.

The COVID-19 pandemic affected tourism in the United Kingdom. In March 2020, the government decided to impose restrictions on all non-essential travel (both domestic and international). It was reported that in the month of April Heathrow Airport was expecting 6.7 million passengers, but only 200,000 arrived which is roughly equivalent to a normal day. In April 2020, professional services firm PricewaterhouseCoopers expected that the worst affected sectors in the U.K. such as transport, hotels and food service could drop by at a minimum 15% or in the worst-case scenario by 40%.

The restrictions and lockdowns necessitated by the COVID-19 pandemic (starting in March or April 2020) affected all sectors of the economy and "Tourism and hospitality suffered notable losses from the pandemic", according to March 2021 report published by the Fraser of Allander Institute. The group provided detailed specifics for both domestic and international visits. COVID-19 lockdowns necessitated significantly reduced the number of visitors in 2020, and into 2021. Although the government announced a £56m "welcome back fund" in March 2021 to help councils and businesses in coastal towns prepare to welcome tourists back safely in summer, "as soon as the roadmap allows" despite the COVID-19 Alpha variant emerged. As of March 2021, a 10-day quarantine period applies to people entering the UK from a number of "red list" countries.

As the country surpassed 100,000 COVID-19 related deaths, a VisitBritain report in January 2021 discussed the effects of the pandemic on domestic tourism within the UK in 2020, citing a significant reduction in spending, for an estimated decline of 62% over the previous year. The forecast for 2021 suggested that spending would increase by 79% over the previous year and that "the value of spending will be back to 84% of 2019 levels" by the end of 2021. The forecasts were based on predictions about the easing of travel restrictions and an increase in consumer confidence.

The same VisitBritain report provided the following estimate for "inbound tourism" in 2020: a "decline of 76% in visits to 9.7 million and a decline of 80% in spending to £5.7 billion". The forecast for 2021 indicated an estimated "11.7 million visits, up 21% on 2020, but only 29% of the 2019 level". Some £6.6 billion would be spent by inbound tourists, "up 16% on 2020 but only 23% of the 2019 level". An increase in the number of visits was expected as 2021 developed, but that would start slowly and tourism was not expected to come "even close to normal levels" during the year.

On 5 April 2021, BBC News published an update on domestic tourism, indicating that travel restrictions were expected to be loosened during that month, at least for travel within England, Scotland and Wales. No announcement had been made as of early April by Northern Ireland. The tourism authority also indicated that there was a plan for the UK to loosen restrictions on international travel on 17 May, both inbound and outbound, but it was premature to predict whether those changes would actually commence at the expected time.

On 6 April 2021, CNN published an update as to the tourism situation, particularly for readers in nations. Any visitors from "red list" countries were still not allowed to enter unless they were UK residents. "There's still not much to do in the UK right now ... although this lockdown is now being eased some restrictions will likely be in place until the summer", the report predicted, with June being the most likely time for tourism from other countries to begin a rebound.

It was possible that loosening of the UK's restrictions on inbound tourists would not commence as early as planned because sources in the European Union stated on 8 April 2021 that a "third wave of the pandemic [was sweeping] the continent". (Two days earlier, PM Boris Johnson had made it clear that "We don't want to see the virus being reimported into this country from abroad".) Of particular concern was the B.1.1.7. variant, a mutation of the virus, "which [was] spreading rapidly in at least 27 and other European countries".

Some restrictions on hospitality and domestic tourism were loosened in England on 12 April 2021; pubs and restaurants were allowed to open their outdoor facilities; non-essential stores opened; families were allowed to travel within England "in self-contained accommodation" and travel between Wales and England was fully permitted. Restrictions regarding tourism were not lifted in Scotland and Northern Ireland; in addition to permitting travel to and from England, Wales permitted non-essential retail stores to open.

In April 2022 same day as Ireland, Finland, Malaysia, Singapore, and other countries, COVID-19 tourism impact in the U.K. was officially ended by early April 2022 as the country ahead of endemic phase.

== Politics ==
The Parliamentary Under Secretary of State for Arts, Heritage and Tourism is the minister with responsibility over tourism in England.

== Domestic tourism ==
Domestic tourism remains the biggest component of tourist spending in the UK, with 2008 expenditures totalling £21.9 billion, according to VisitBritain. The national statistical agency also estimates that there were 126 million trips made in 2009. The busiest period for domestic travel in the UK is during bank holidays and the summer months, with August being the busiest.

== International tourism ==
Yearly tourist arrivals in millions

In 2024 a total 42.6 million people visited the UK from overseas and cumulatively spent £32.5 billion. The United States was the largest source market, with 5.6 million visits, followed by France with 3.6 million and Germany with 3.3 million.

Statistics on visits to the UK by oversea residents and residents from the UK visiting overseas

Overseas visits to the UK by month

Purpose of overseas visits to the UK

UK residents' oversea visits

== Visa and entry requirements ==
United Kingdom Freedom of movement / Common Travel Area Electronic travel authorization or visa required Visa not required if and only if holding a valid BIVS Irish visa and arriving at the UK from Ireland for the remaining period granted by the Irish immigration official; otherwise, visa required for entry, and all transit (unless holding exemption documents) Visa required for entry, and landside transit (unless holding exemption documents); visa-free airside transit at EGLL (Heathrow Airport), or EGCC (Manchester Airport) only Visa required for entry and all transit (unless holding exemption documents)

Visa requirements are different depending on the origin of the individual wishing to enter the United Kingdom. Some individuals are entitled to enter the United Kingdom without a visa and have no restrictions on their length of stay, work policies or study policies. These groups are: British nationals, citizens of Commonwealth countries who have the right of abode, Irish citizens and until at least 31 December 2020, European Union citizens and citizens of EFTA member states. There are 56 other countries and territories that can stay in the UK for up to 6 months. Nationals of other countries are required to hold a Standard Visitor visa, costing £95, to be able to visit for up to 6 months.

== Major attractions ==
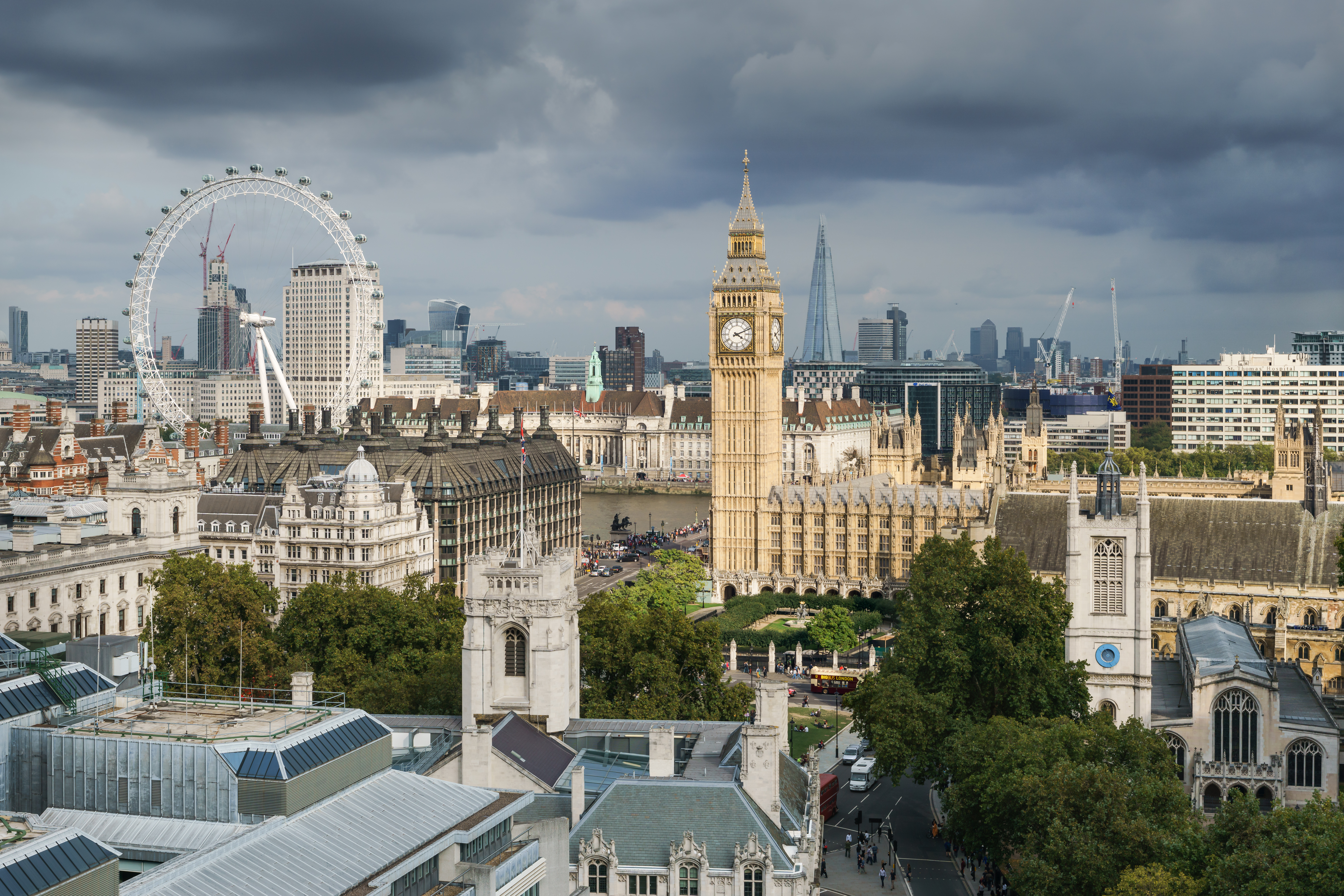
View of London showing the London Eye, the Palace of Westminster, and The Shard

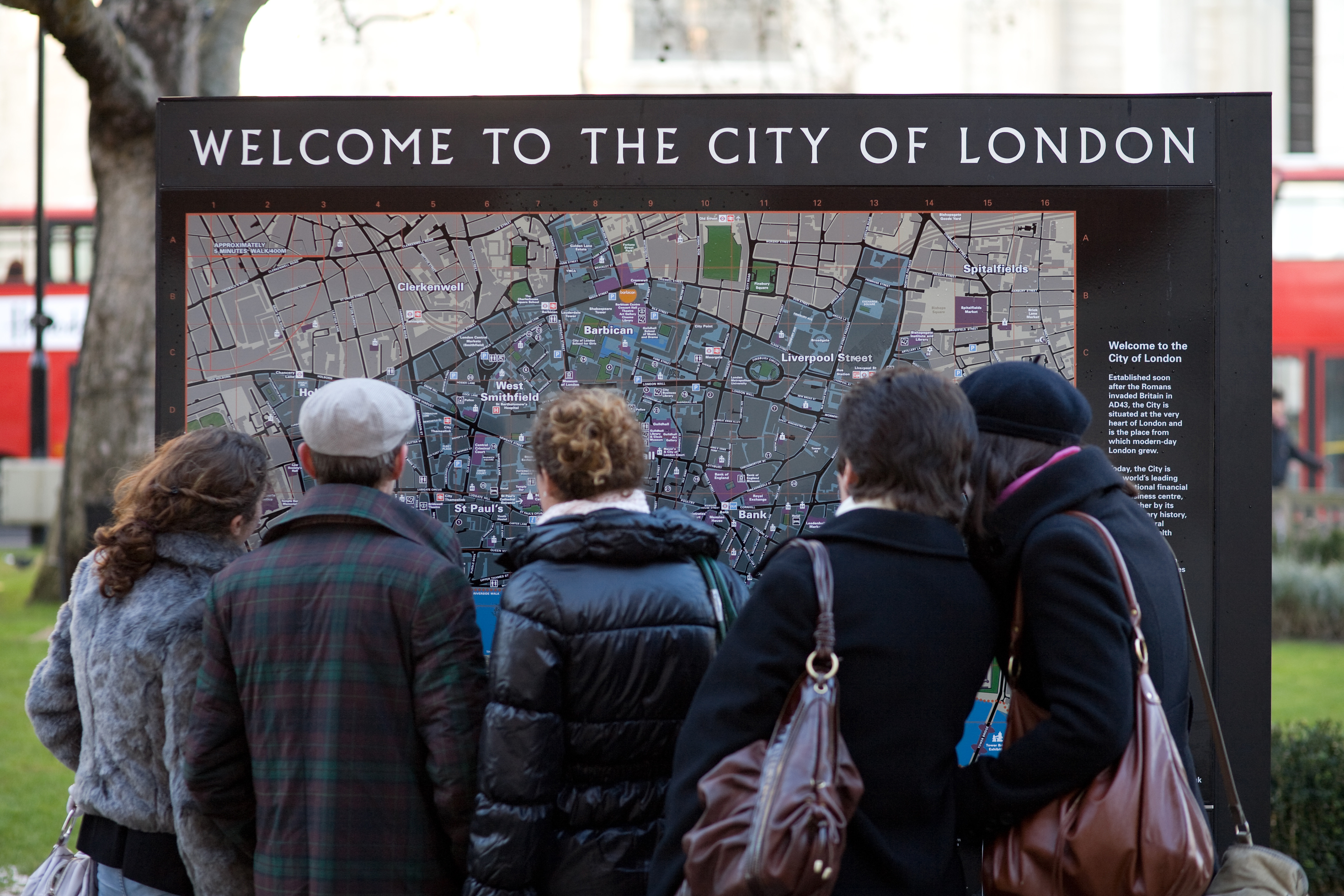
Tourists consulting a map near St. Paul's Cathedral

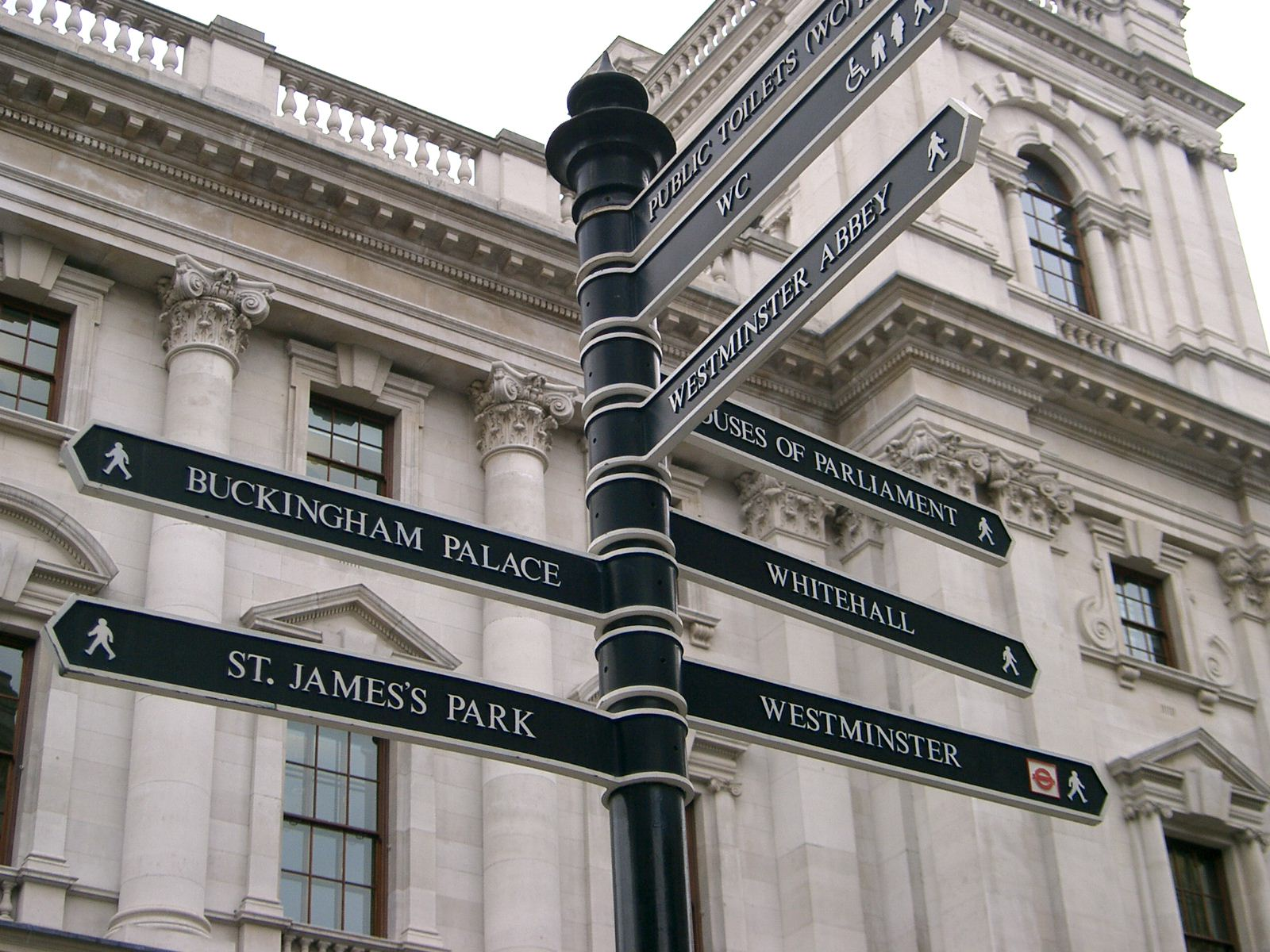
A signpost on Parliament Square with directions for nearby attractions

London is the most visited city in the United Kingdom, and some of the smaller town and cities attract a significant number of tourists. The country's other large cities such as Edinburgh, Manchester and Liverpool draw large numbers, and some smaller cities have major tourist attraction landmarks. The university cities of Oxford and Cambridge are, despite their smaller population, recognised worldwide because of the Oxbridge universities’ legacies.

VisitBritain, the tourist board of Great Britain, analyses data from the Office for National Statistics to estimate the number of visitors that attend each attraction. This can be difficult to measure for landmarks such as Buckingham Palace or the Palace of Westminster, as many tourists visit the surrounding area without actually being admitted into the venue.

== Transport ==
=== Arriving in the United Kingdom ===
The United Kingdom only has one land border where Northern Ireland meets the Republic of Ireland. This border is considered an open border due to the Common Travel Area arrangement and as a result is subject to minimal controls. The lack of control at the border makes it difficult to estimate the number of visitors from the Republic of Ireland into Northern Ireland. In 2018, the total number of international visits to the United Kingdom was 37.9 million. Out of the 37.9 million visitors, 29.06 million arrived by aeroplane, 4.81 million by boat and 4.04 million crossed from France using the Channel Tunnel.

=== Travelling within the United Kingdom ===
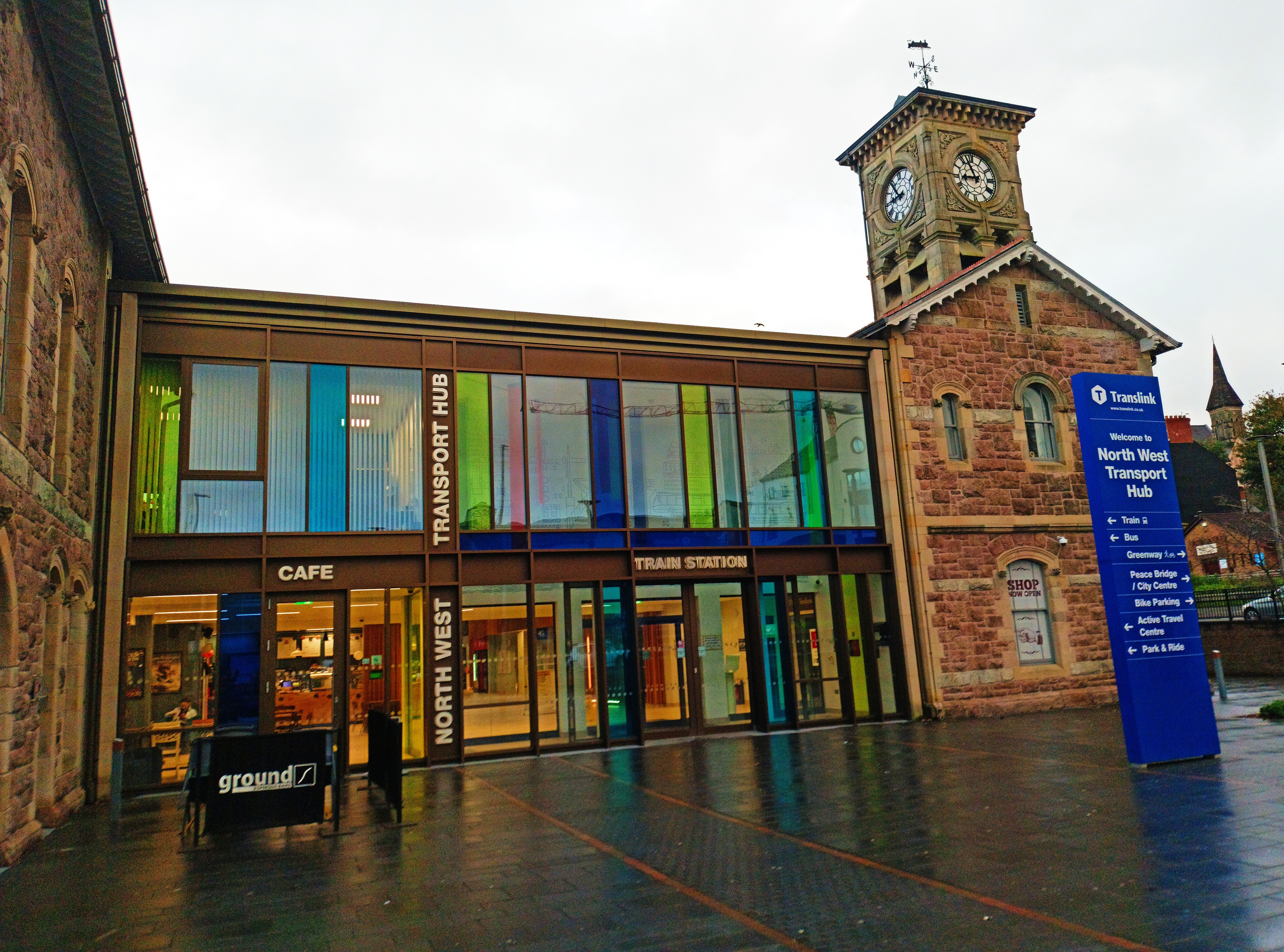
Derry~Londonderry railway station on the scenic Belfast-Derry railway line run by Northern Ireland Railways

With 48% of tourists using intracity buses, tubes, trams and metro trains; they are by far the most popular methods of transport. The next most common methods of transports are taxis and trains (outside town/city) with 27% and 23% respectively. Trains are used to travel between cities significantly more than aeroplanes, with only 1% of international visitors flying domestically. This has been attributed to the United Kingdom's vast rail network being the most economical way to travel. Despite Uber being in a legal battle to operate in London, the rise of Uber and other ride-sharing companies throughout the United Kingdom has led to them being used by 9% of international tourists and they are expected to further increase, reducing the market share of other methods of transport.

== Events, festivals and exhibitions ==
The United Kingdom plays host to a variety of events that attract both international and domestic tourists. Some of the United Kingdom's most famous festivals include Notting Hill Carnival, Glastonbury and the Edinburgh Fringe Festival. These festivals not only hold cultural significance but are also a major economic component of the United Kingdom's tourist industry, with Glastonbury alone contributing £100 million to the economy annually. The beauty, real estate and arms industries are some of the many industries that hold trade shows and exhibitions year-round throughout the United Kingdom, with the majority being held in London or Birmingham. VisitBritain has estimated in 2015 there were 65 million day visits centred around events, festivals and exhibitions and in total, they accounted for 5% of all tourist day visits and a net spend of £3.6 billion.

== Marketing ==
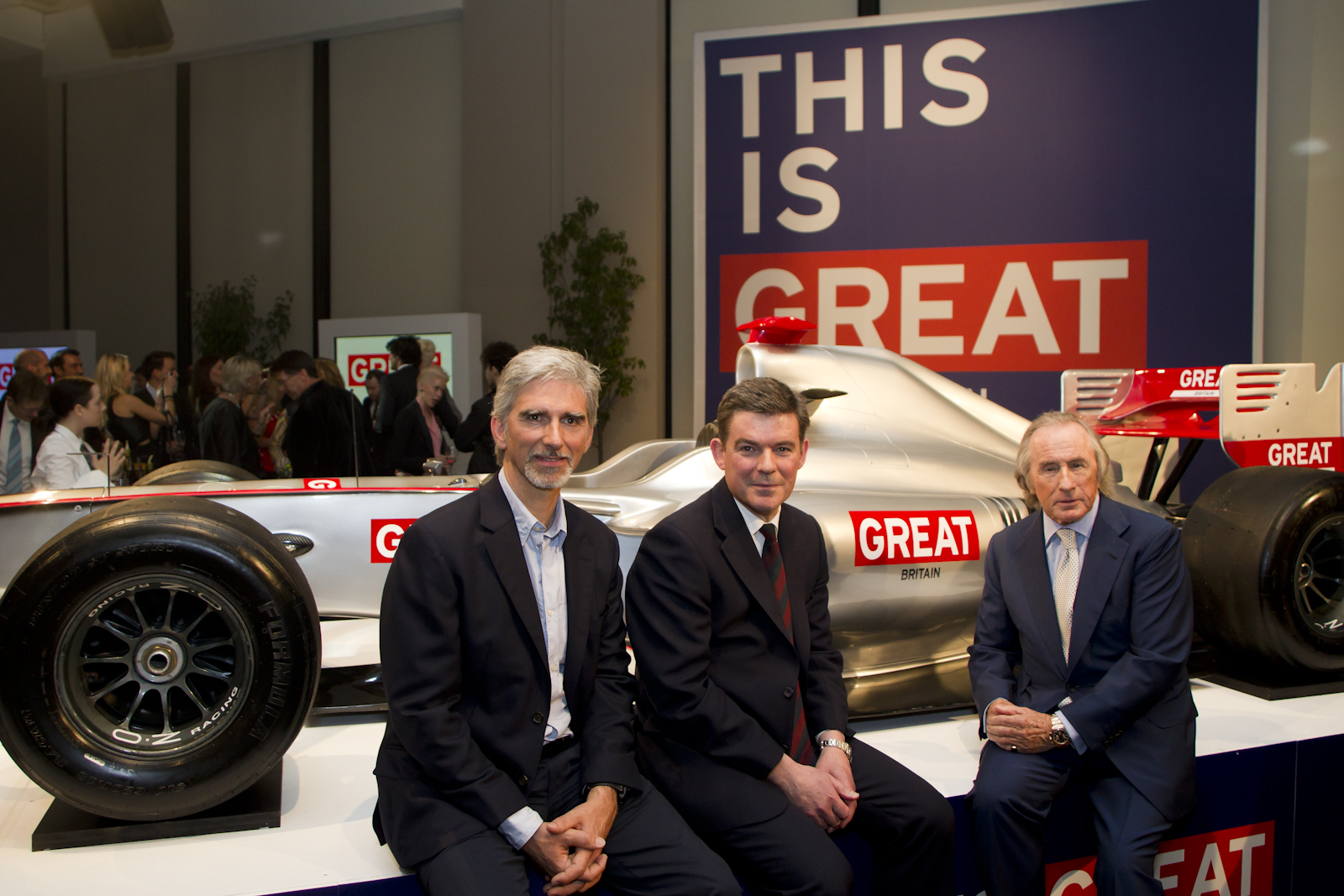
Launch of GREAT campaign, Australia

In 2011, VisitBritain launched GREAT, one of a £100 million marketing campaign, promoting the United Kingdom through culture, heritage, sport, music, countryside, food and shopping. The campaign has successfully reached over 145 countries and united both the public and private sectors to generate growth and jobs. Overall, inbound and domestic marketing have generated £1 billion in additional visitor spend, of which, £800 million can be attributed to the GREAT campaign.

== Shopping ==
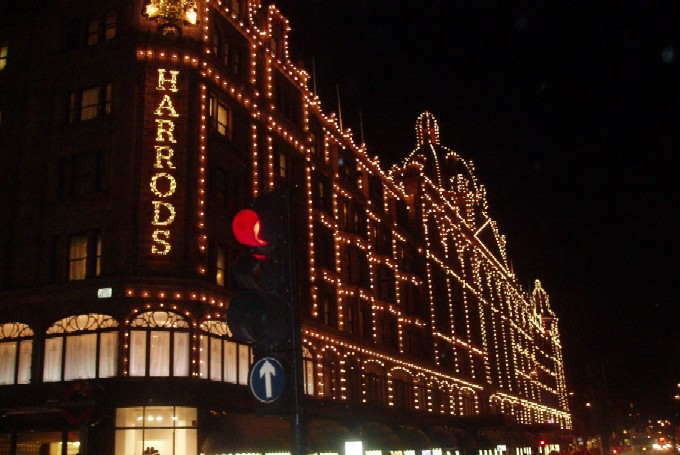
Harrods at night

Shopping is one of the most common activities for overseas visitors to the United Kingdom with 58% of all visits and 70% of leisure visits involving shopping. Each year, roughly 277,000 people travel to the United Kingdom for the primary reason of personal shopping. The total spend of these visits is around £168 million. The most commonly purchased items are clothes and shoes with just over 40% of visitors purchasing at least one item of clothing or a pair of shoes.

Ornamental souvenirs representing items found in the United Kingdom such as post office boxes, black cabs and London buses are commonly found in souvenir shops over the United Kingdom. Other examples of commonly purchased souvenirs include: Union Jack branded goods, items from famous department stores like Harrods and Selfridges and memorabilia surrounding the British royal family.

== Tourism today ==
Top 10 countries whose residents (including British and other nationals) provided the most visits to the UK (2023)
Country	Number
United States	5,122,000
France	3,172,000
Germany	2,957,000
Republic of Ireland	2,889,000
Spain	2,210,000
The Netherlands	1,960,000
Italy	1,696,000
Poland	1,628,000
Australia	1,169,000
Canada	1,003,000

The United Kingdom attracts worldwide visitors with a combination of rural and urban scenery and the appeal of British Culture which includes sport, food and art.

== See also ==
For more information on tourism in the United Kingdom please see the articles for the individual countries of the UK: Countries of the United Kingdom

- Tourism in England
- Tourism in Northern Ireland
- Tourism in Scotland
- Tourism in Wales

Further information

- Tourism in London
- Seven Natural Wonders of the UK
- Visa policy of the United Kingdom
- Visa policy of the British Overseas Territories
