= Tourism in England =

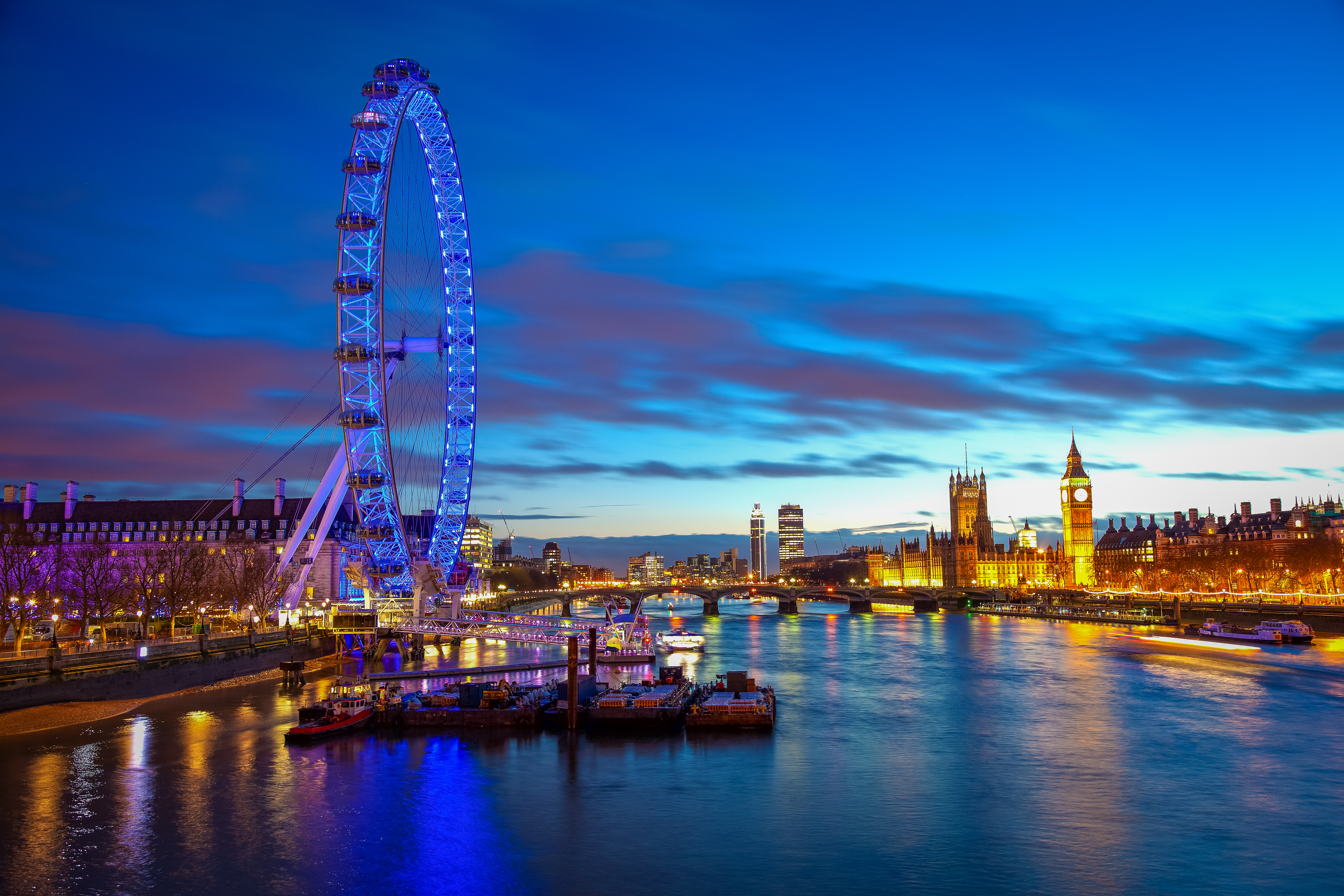
The London Eye observation wheel is the most popular paid tourist attraction in the United Kingdom with over 3 million visitors annually.

Tourism plays a significant part in the economy of England. In 2018, the United Kingdom as a whole was the world's 10th most visited country for tourists, and 17 of the United Kingdom's 25 UNESCO World Heritage Sites fall within England.

VisitEngland is the official tourist board for England. VisitEngland's stated mission is to build England's tourism product, raise Britain's profile worldwide, increase the volume and value of tourism exports and develop England and Britain's visitor economy. In 2020, the Lonely Planet travel guide rated England as the second best country to visit that year, after Bhutan.

Lockdowns necessitated by the COVID-19 pandemic significantly reduced the number of visitors in 2020–2022, a 10-day quarantine period applied to people entering England from a number of "red list" countries.

== Cities ==
The 15 English cities visited most by overseas tourists in 2019 were:

#	City	Annual visitors (millions)
1	London	21.7
2	Manchester	1.7
3	Birmingham	1.1
4	Liverpool	0.84
5	Brighton and Hove	0.64
6	Bristol	0.63
7	Oxford	0.58
8	Cambridge	0.42
9	Bath	0.4
10	Leeds	0.33
11	York	0.29
12	Newcastle-upon-Tyne	0.28
13	Stratford-upon-Avon (town)	0.27
14	Nottingham	0.24
15	Coventry	0.24

== Rankings ==
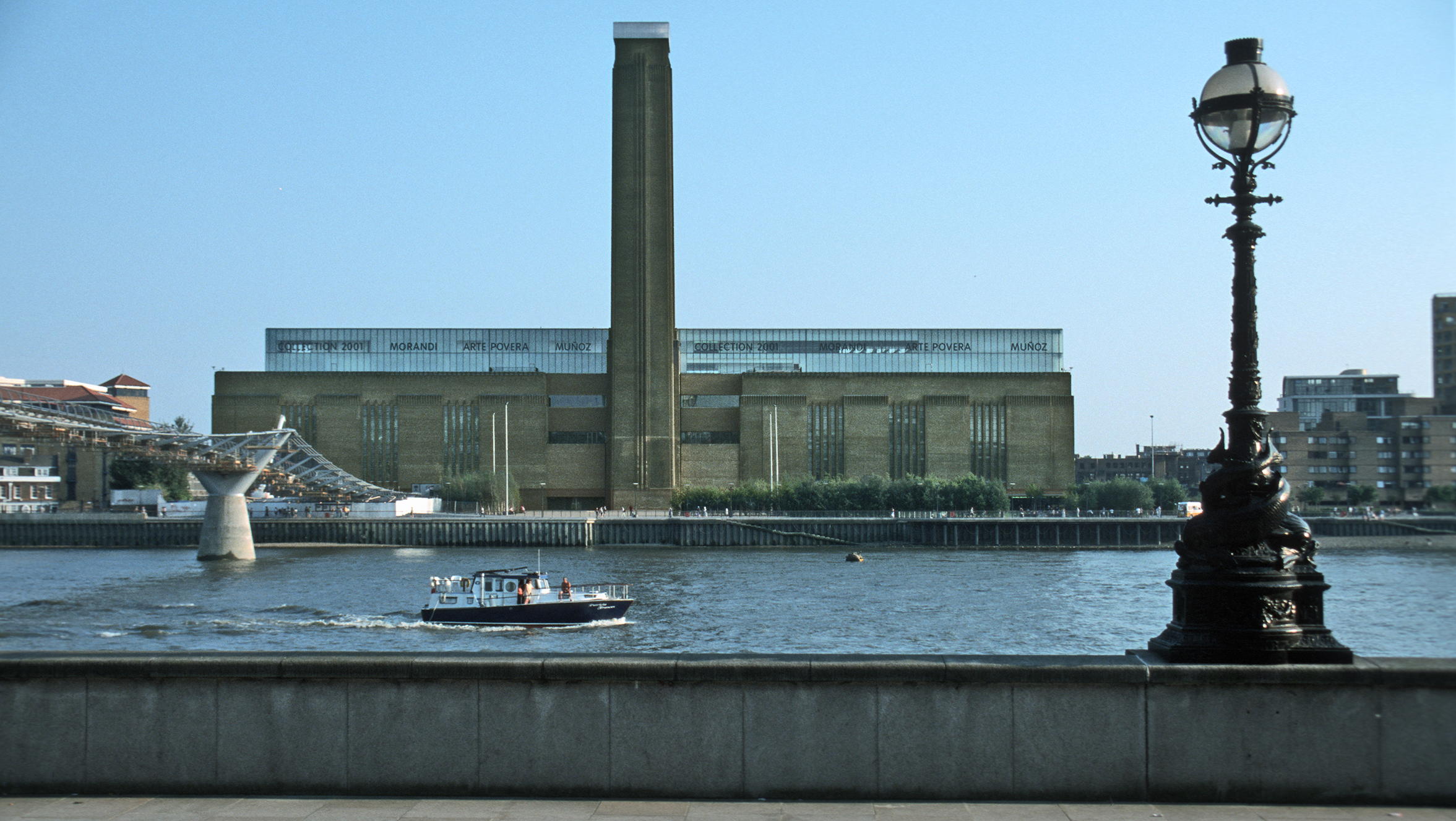
The Tate Modern art gallery in London was England's top tourist attraction in 2018.

Unlike other countries, most state-run museums and places of cultural interest in England are free of charge to visit. Museums are an important aspect of English culture, and most cities and towns have a few museums and art galleries. Some of the most visited places are:

Attraction ranking excluding Greater London
#	Museum	County	Visitors (2022)
1	Windsor Great Park	Berkshire	5,636,844
2	Wisley Garden	Surrey	1,494,709
3	Stonehenge	Wiltshire	977,316
4	Windsor Castle	Berkshire	927,331
5	Bath's Roman Baths and Grand Pump Room	Somerset	851,854
6	Longleat	Wiltshire	814,263
7	Moors Valley Country Park	Dorset	810,707
8	Blenheim Palace	Oxfordshire	806,806
9	Beamish Museum	County Durham	773,814
10	Whipsnade Zoo	Bedfordshire	760,087
11	Ashmolean Museum	Oxfordshire	728,006
12	Portsmouth Historic Dockyard	Hampshire	718,990
13	Bodleian Libraries	Oxfordshire	711,478
15	Oxford University Museum of Natural History	Oxfordshire	675,557
16	Royal Shakespeare Company	Warwickshire	672,487
17	World Museum	Merseyside	669,684
18	Eden Project	Cornwall	658,084
18	York Minster	North Yorkshire	620,591
20	Sherwood Pines Forest Park	Nottinghamshire	612,804

Greater London attraction ranking
Rank	Museum	Visitors (2022)
1	Natural History Museum	4,654,608
2	British Museum	4,097,253
3	Tate Modern	3,883,160
4	Southbank Centre	2,947,155
5	National Gallery	2,727,119
6	Victoria and Albert Museum	2,370,261
7	Somerset House	2,346,580
8	London Science Museum	2,334,930
9	Tower of London	2,020,121
10	Royal Botanic Gardens Kew	1,963,885
11	Royal Museums Greenwich	1,628,580
12	Royal Albert Hall	1,449,486
13	St Paul's Cathedral	1,193,888
14	British Library	1,149,070
15	Westminster Abbey	1,063,063
16	London Zoo	1,045,289
17	Tate Britain	913,395
18	Horniman Museum and Gardens	790,067
19	Royal Opera House Covent Garden	697,001
20	Royal Academy of Arts	695,968

== World Heritage Sites ==
17 of the 25 United Kingdom's UNESCO World Heritage Sites fall within England. Some of the best known of these include Stonehenge, the Tower of London, the Jurassic Coast, Westminster, the Roman Baths in Bath, Saltaire, Ironbridge Gorge and Studley Royal Park.

The northernmost point of the Roman Empire, Hadrian's Wall, is the largest Roman artifact in the world, running a total of 73 miles in northern England.

== National Parks ==
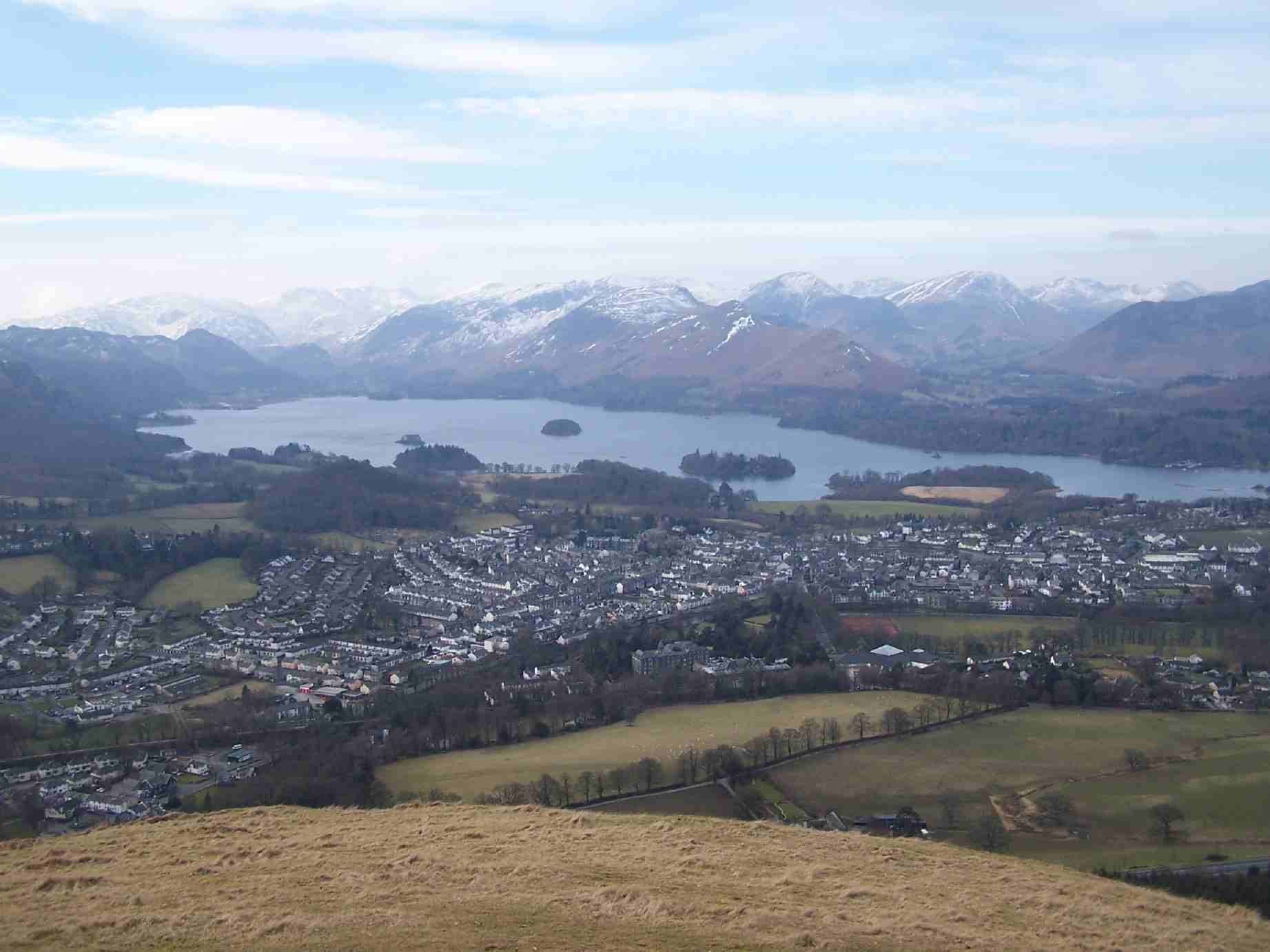
Lake District National Park is one of England's many UNESCO World Heritage Sites and national parks.

Some notable National Parks in England include:

- Lake District National Park — mountains, lakes and woodlands; the land of Wordsworth.
- New Forest National Park — one of the few remnants of the great oak and hornbeam woodland that once covered southern England.
- North York Moors National Park — heather-clad hills, woodlands, sea cliffs and secluded beaches
- Peak District National Park — rugged moors and hills which form the northern spine of England.
- South Downs National Park — the gentle rolling chalk downs of southern England.

England possesses a wide range of natural environments, and continues to benefit from a significant ecotourism industry. Attractions include:

- Eden Project in Cornwall.
- The Lake District, a national park and mountainous region in Cumbria, including Windermere, the largest lake in England.
- The Peak District, a national park and upland area lying mostly in Derbyshire.
- Dartmoor and Exmoor, national parks and upland areas in Devon/Somerset.
- The New Forest, a rural forest and national park lying mostly in Hampshire.
- The Jurassic Coast, a World Heritage Site in Dorset and Devon.
- The Broads, a national park and lowland area lying mostly in Norfolk.
- The Yorkshire Dales, a national park and upland area in North Yorkshire and Cumbria.
- The National Forest, covering parts of Leicestershire, Derbyshire and Staffordshire.
- The South Downs, a national park stretching from Hampshire to East Sussex and comprising chalk uplands and sea cliffs.
- Center Parcs, a European network of rural holiday parks.

=== Preservation trusts ===
A number of umbrella organisations are devoted to the preservation and public access of both natural and cultural heritage, including English Heritage and the National Trust. Membership with them, even on a temporary basis, gives priority free access to their properties thereafter.

English Heritage has a wide-ranging remit and manages more than 400 significant buildings and Monuments in England. They also maintain a register of thousands of listed buildings, those which are considered of most importance to the historic and cultural heritage of the country.

== Travelling within England ==
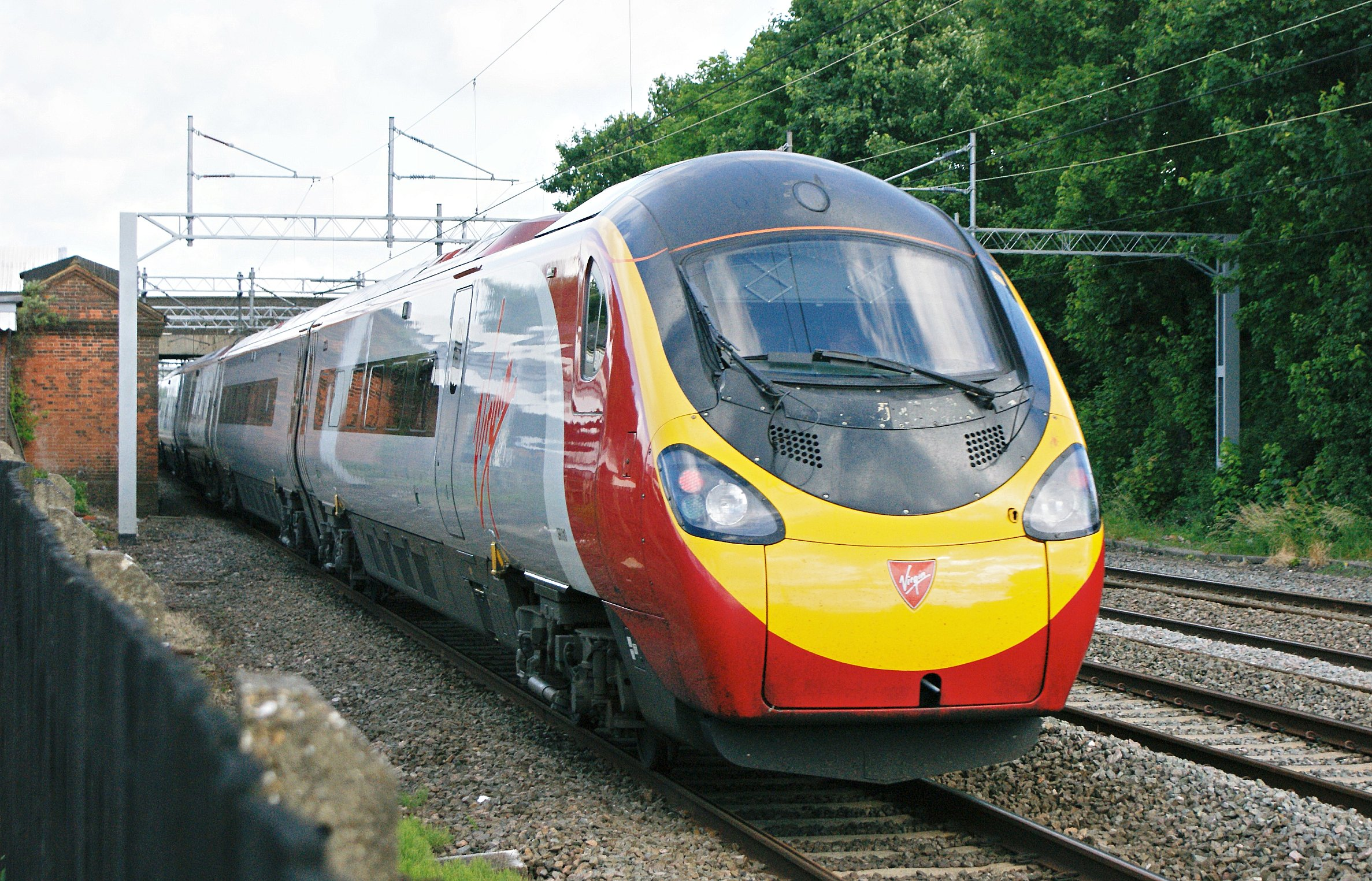
A British Rail Class 390 Pendolino train

The United Kingdom's bus services offers numerous, frequent and reliable transport around most of the larger towns and cities. Rural areas are less well served and hiring a car is often the best option to explore the countryside and villages.

The next most common methods of transports are taxis and trains. Britain's extensive rail network is used to travel between cities significantly more than aeroplanes, with a 2015 survey finding that only 1% of international visitors flew domestically after arrival.

== Politics ==
The Parliamentary Under Secretary of State for Arts, Heritage and Tourism is the minister with responsibility over tourism in the UK.

== Effects of the COVID-19 pandemic ==
The travel restrictions and lockdowns necessitated by the COVID-19 pandemic in 2020 led to a 76% reduction in "inbound tourism" to the UK that year.(Most reports that provide statistics on tourism cover the entire UK as an entity, although some do provide specifics for England.) The forecast for 2021 indicated an estimate that visits would be up "21% on 2020 but only 29% of the 2019 level". Some increase was expected but slowly at first and the report concluded that tourism was not expected to come "even close to normal levels".

The same VisitBritain report also discussed the effects of the pandemic on domestic within the UK in 2020, citing a significant reduction in spending, for an estimated decline of 62% over the previous year. As of January 2021, the forecast for 2021 suggested that spending would increase by 79% over the previous year and that "the value of spending will be back to 84% of 2019 levels" by the end of 2021.

A report published in March 2021 by the Fraser of Allander Institute indicated that "tourism and hospitality suffered notable losses from the pandemic" and provided detailed specifics for both domestic and international visits. The government announced a £56m "welcome back fund" that month to help councils and businesses in coastal towns prepare to welcome tourists back safely in summer, "as soon as the roadmap allows".

On 5 April 2021, the BBC reported that the restrictions on domestic travel were expected to be loosened during that month, at least for travel within England, Scotland and Wales. (No announcement had been made as of early April by Northern Ireland.) The news item predicted that "hotels and B&Bs [were] set to open for holidaymakers in England on 17 May at the earliest". An article in The Guardian stated that "all shops in England will be allowed to reopen from next Monday [12 April], while pubs and restaurants will be allowed to serve customers outdoors. The VisitBritain website provided more specifics on 5 April as to "COVID-19 restrictions" that were expected to be loosened on 12 April but indicated that there was no confirmation as to whether the rules on international travel, either inbound or outbound, would actually be loosened in mid-May.

On 6 April 2021, CNN published an update as to the tourism situation in the UK for visits from other nations. Any visitors from "red list" countries were still not allowed to enter unless they were UK residents. "There's still not much to do in the UK right now ... although this lockdown is now being eased some restrictions will likely be in place until the summer", the report predicted, with June being the most likely time for tourism from other countries to begin a rebound.

On 5 April 2021, the VisitBritain website discussed a plan to relax some restrictions on visits to the UK from other nations by mid-May. The feasibility of the plan became less certain as of 8 April 2021 when sources in the European Union stated on that a "third wave of the pandemic [was sweeping] the continent"; the B117 variant was of particular concern. Two days earlier, PM Boris Johnson had made it clear that "We don't want to see the virus being reimported into this country from abroad".

Some restrictions on hospitality and domestic tourism were loosened in England on 12 April 2021; pubs and restaurants were allowed to open their outdoor facilities; non-essential stores opened; families were allowed to travel within England "in self-contained accommodation" and travel between Wales and England was fully permitted.

== See also ==
- Lists of tourist attractions in England
- Parliamentary Under Secretary of State for Arts, Heritage and Tourism
- Enjoy England
- Institute of Tourist Guiding
- Tourism in the United Kingdom
