= Lists of tourist attractions in England =

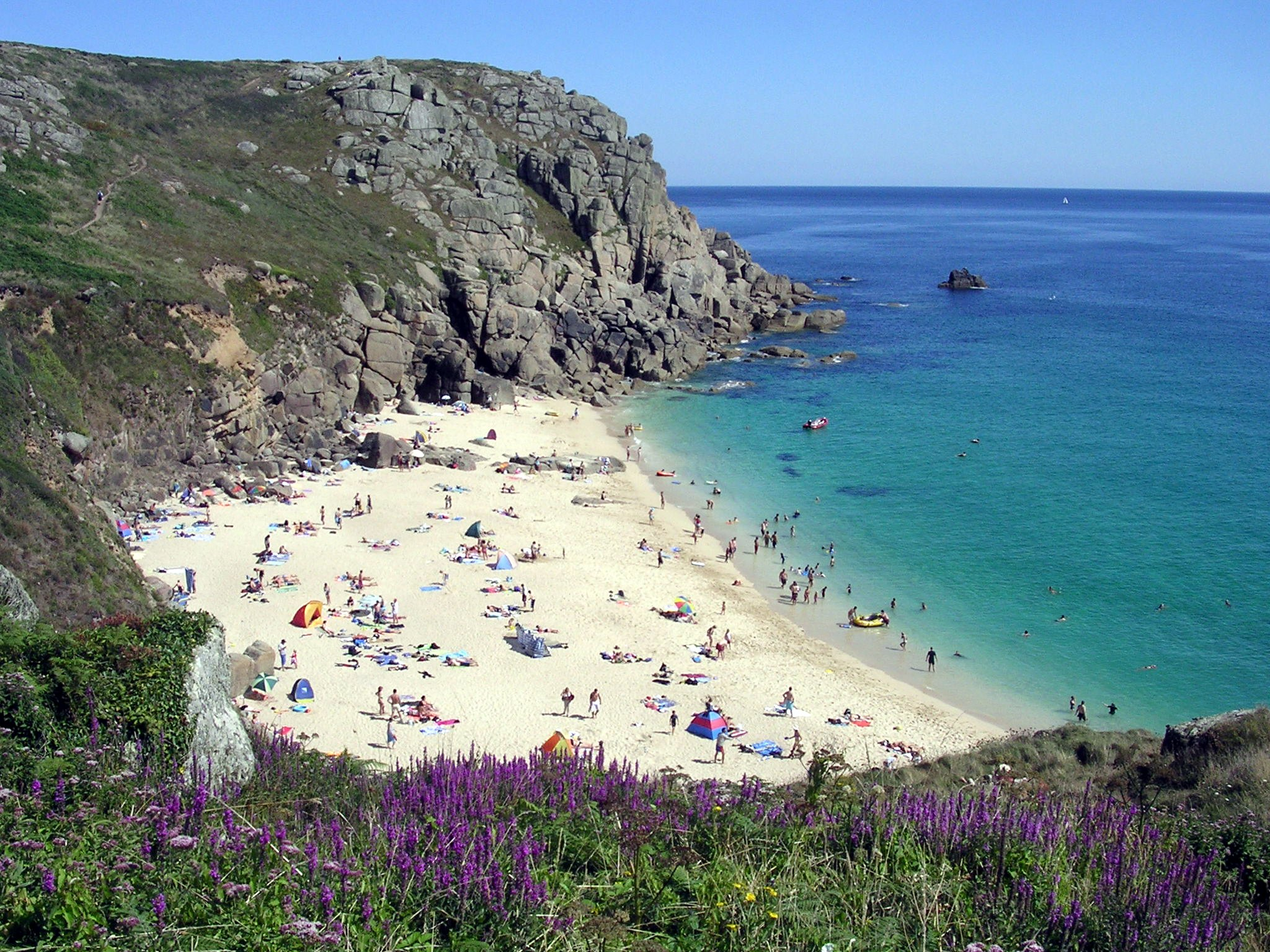
Porthchapel Beach in Cornwall, a popular surfing destination

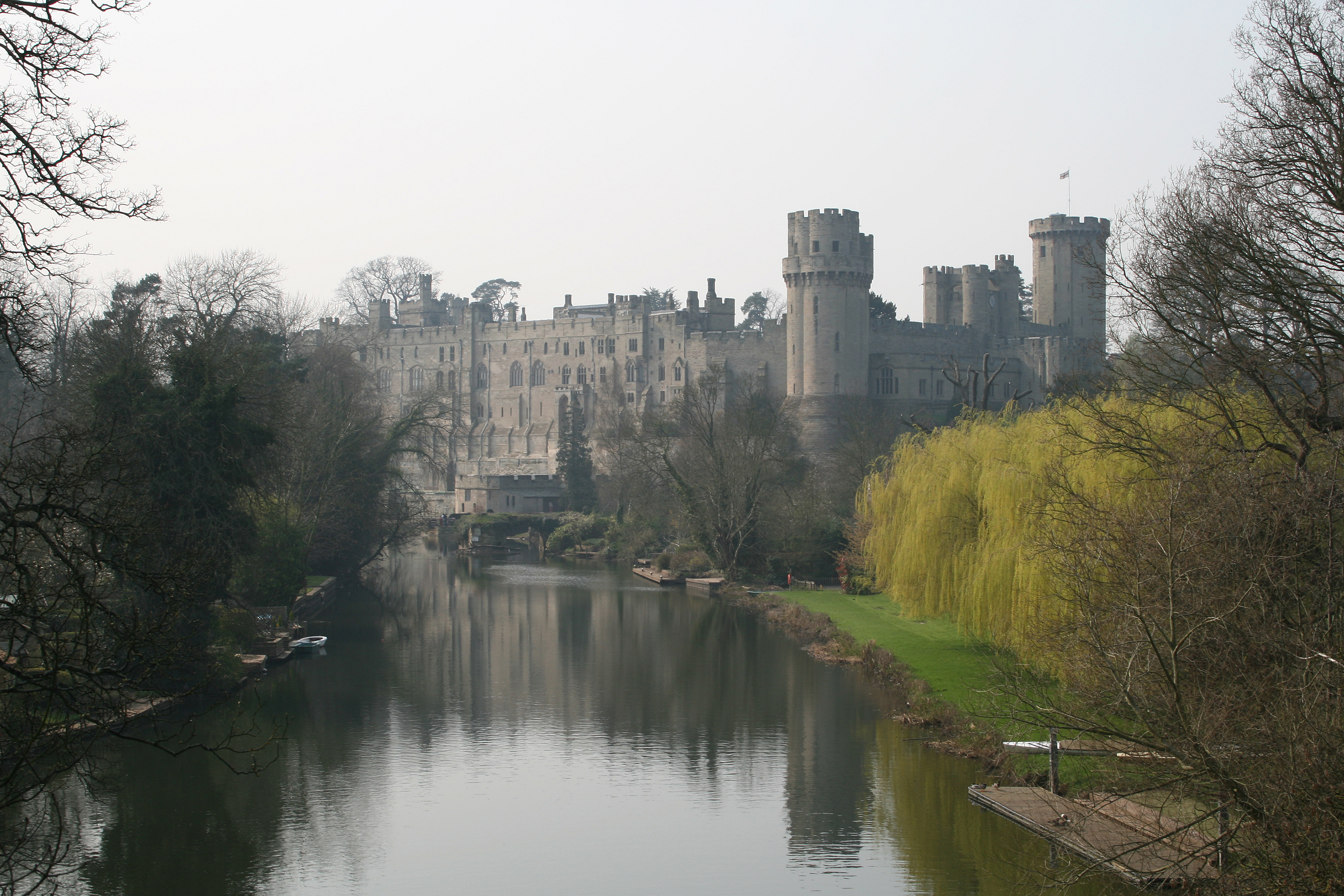
Warwick Castle, one of England's best preserved

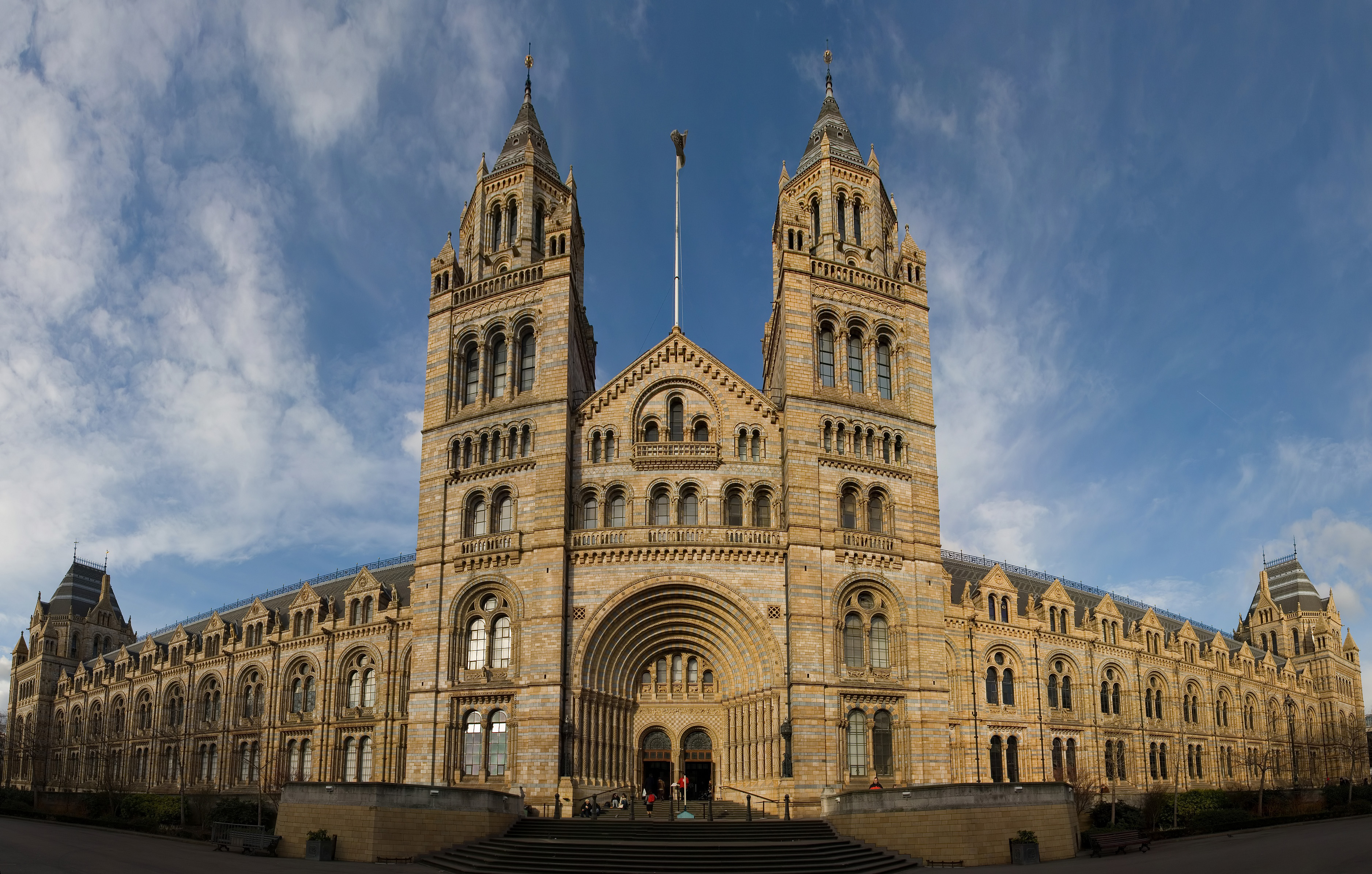
The world famous Natural History Museum in London

This article contains lists of tourist attractions in England.

- Abbeys and priories in England
- List of amusement parks in the United Kingdom
  - Amongst the most popular amusement and theme parks in England are Pleasure Beach Blackpool, Alton Towers, Thorpe Park and Legoland Windsor.
- Anglo-Saxon sites in England
  - There are very few surviving Anglo-Saxon buildings in England, however countless artefacts from the age can be seen in museums across the country.
- Aquariums in England
  - Some of England's larger and most visited aquariums include the Blue Planet Aquarium, The Deep, the National Sea Life Centre and Oceanarium Bournemouth.
- Art museums and galleries in England
  - London's National Gallery and Tate Modern both received in excess of 4.7 million visitors in 2009. Other notable English art galleries include the National Portrait Gallery, Tate Britain, Tate Liverpool, Saatchi Gallery, Manchester Art Gallery, Tate St Ives and the Walker Art Gallery.
- Beaches in England
  - England, being part of the island of Great Britain, has many beaches. The nation's favourites are often cited as being in Devon and Cornwall although the northern towns of Blackpool and Scarborough are also famed seaside resorts. Other notable beaches in England include Chesil Beach, Fistral Beach and the beaches of the Jurassic Coast.
- Casinos in England
  - England is not famed for its casinos, but other forms of betting are popular throughout the country.
- Castles in England
  - The Tower of London is the most visited castle in England (with 2,389,548 visitors in 2009). Leeds Castle, Dover Castle, Windsor Castle, Lindisfarne Castle and Warwick Castle are also amongst England's more notable castles.
- Festivals in England
  - There are festivals and carnivals year-round in the UK, catering to every possible music and cultural genre. The Notting Hill Carnival is the second largest street festival in the world; the Carnaval del Pueblo is Europe's largest celebration of Latin American culture; whilst events such as Creamfields, V Festival, Glastonbury Festival and the Reading and Leeds Festivals tend to attract younger generations.
- Gardens in England
- Heritage railways in England
- Hill forts in England
- Historic houses in England
- Indoor Arenas in England
- Market towns in England
- Monuments and memorials in England
- Museums in England
- National parks in England
- Nature reserves in England
- Palaces in England
- Parks in England
- Piers in England
- Prehistoric sites in England
- Roman sites in England
- Seaside resorts in England
- Shopping centres in England
- Stadiums in England
- Zoos in England

== See also ==
- Tourism in England
- Economy of England
- Transport in England
- Lists of tourist attractions
- List of tourist attractions in the Isle of Wight
- List of tourist attractions in Kent
- List of tourist attractions in London
- List of tourist attractions in Oxford
- List of tourist attractions in Sheffield
- List of tourist attractions in Somerset
