= World Tourism rankings =

List compiled by the UN World Tourism Organization

Countries by tourist arrivals in 2019

The World Tourism rankings are compiled by the United Nations's World Tourism Organization as part of their World Tourism Barometer publication, which is released up to six times per year. It ranks destinations by the number of international visitor arrivals, by the revenue generated by inbound tourism, and by the expenditure of outbound travelers.

== Most visited destinations by international tourist arrivals ==
In 2025, there were 1.52 billion international tourists, with a growth of 4.0% compared to 2024. The top ten destinations were:

International tourist arrivals (in millions)
Destination	2024	Change (2023 to 2024) (%)	2023	2022
France	102.0	▲2.0	100.0	93.2
Spain	93.8	▲10.1	85.2	71.7
United States	72.4	▲9.0	66.4	50.8
Turkey	60.6	▲9.8	55.2	50.5
Italy	57.7	▲0.8	57.3	49.8
Mexico	45.0	▲7.3	42.0	38.3
United Kingdom	41.8	▲12.0	37.2	30.7
Germany	37.5	▲7.7	34.8	28.5
Japan	36.9	▲11.8	25.1	3.8
Greece	36.0	▲10.1	32.7	27.8

== Rankings by continent ==
=== Africa ===
In 2024, Africa welcomed approximately 75.4 million international tourist arrivals, reflecting a strong recovery in the continent’s tourism industry. The top ten African destinations in 2024 were:

International tourist arrivals (in millions)
Destination	2024	2023	2022
Morocco	17.4	14.5	10.9
Egypt (Note: The source, UNWTO, considers Egypt to be a part of the Middle East rather than Africa.)	15.8	14.9	11.7
Tunisia	10.3	9.4	6.4
South Africa	8.9	8.5	5.7
Algeria	3.5	3.3	1.4
Zambia	2.2	1.4	1.1
Tanzania	2.1	1.8	1.5
Zimbabwe	1.6	1.6	1.0
Mauritius	1.4	1.3	1.0
Uganda	1.4	1.3	0.8

=== Americas ===
In 2024, there were 213.4 million international tourist arrivals to the Americas, an increase of 6.7% compared to 2023. In 2025, the top ten destinations were:

International tourist arrivals (in millions)
Destination	2025	2024	2023 (Note: All 2023 (Americas) figures are from official national tourism authorities and government statistical releases: 1. "International Visitor Arrivals to the United States – 2023" (PDF). U.S. National Travel and Tourism Office (NTTO). May 2024.; 2. "Turismo de Internación a México 2023". Secretaría de Turismo (SECTUR) / INEGI. 2024.; 3. "Year-in-Review 2023 – Overnight Arrivals". Destination Canada. 2024.; 4. "Informe de Turismo 2023" (PDF). Ministerio de Turismo de la República Dominicana (MITUR). January 2024.; 5. "Brasil recebeu 5,9 milhões de turistas estrangeiros em 2023". Ministério do Turismo / Embratur. January 2024.; 6. "Anuario Estadístico de Turismo 2023" (PDF). Ministerio de Turismo y Deportes de Argentina. 2024.; 7. "En 2023 más de 5,86 millones de viajeros no residentes llegaron a Colombia". Ministerio de Comercio, Industria y Turismo (MinCIT). January 2024.; 8. "Discover Puerto Rico Annual Report 2023". Discover Puerto Rico / Puerto Rico Tourism Company. 2024.; 9. "Perfil del Turista Receptivo 2023". Subsecretaría de Turismo de Chile. 2024.; 10. "Perú recibió 2,5 millones de turistas extranjeros en 2023". Ministerio de Comercio Exterior y Turismo (MINCETUR). February 2024.)	2022 (Note: All 2022 (Americas) figures are from official national tourism statistics and government sources: 1. "International Visitation to the United States — 2022" (PDF). U.S. National Travel & Tourism Office (NTTO). May 2023.; 2. "Results of Tourism Activity — December 2022 (International Visitors to Mexico)" (PDF). SECTUR / INEGI (DataTur). January 2023.; 3. "Year-in-Review 2022 — Overnight Arrivals" (PDF). Destination Canada. 2023.; 4. "Datos 2022 — Llegadas de Extranjeros No Residentes". Ministerio de Turismo de la República Dominicana (SITUR / MITUR). 2024.; 5. "Brasil recebe mais de 3,63 milhões de turistas estrangeiros em 2022". Ministério do Turismo do Brasil. 31 January 2023.; 6. "Anuario Estadístico de Turismo 2022" (PDF). Ministerio de Turismo y Deportes de la Nación (Argentina). 2023.; 7. "Colombia cerró 2022 con 4,6 millones de visitantes no residentes". Fondo Nacional de Turismo (FONTUR) / MinCIT (cifras Migración Colombia). 21 September 2023.; 8. "Discover Puerto Rico Announces 2022 as a Record-Setting Year". Discover Puerto Rico (DMO). 8 December 2022.; 9. "Más de dos millones de turistas extranjeros visitaron Chile en 2022". Subsecretaría de Turismo (Gobierno de Chile). 31 January 2023.; 10. "Informe de Transferencia de Gestión del Sector — 2023 (Cierre 2022)" (PDF). Ministerio de Comercio Exterior y Turismo (MINCETUR, Perú). 9 May 2023.)
United States	68.3	72.4	66.3	50.8
Mexico	47.8	45.0	41.9	38.3
Canada	19.8	20.0	18.3	12.8
Brazil	9.3	6.7	5.9	3.6
Dominican Republic	8.9	8.5	8.0	7.1
Colombia	6.2	6.5	5.8	4.5
Puerto Rico	6.1	5.6	5.0	4.2
Chile	6.0	5.2	3.7	2.0
Argentina	5.7	6.6	7.2	3.8
Peru	3.4	3.2	2.5	2.0

=== Asia (incl. West Asia) ===
In 2024, the top ten destinations were:

International tourist arrivals (in millions)
Destination	2024 (Note: Official 2024 (Asia) data from national tourism authorities and statistics offices: 1. "610 Million Exit-Entry Trips Recorded in 2024 (incl. 64.882 million foreign nationals' trips)". National Immigration Administration (China). 15 January 2025.; 2. "HKTB: Close to 45 Million Visitors in 2024 (provisional)" (PDF). Hong Kong Tourism Board. 15 January 2025.; 3. "Japan caps record year with 36.87 million visitors in 2024". Reuters. 15 January 2025.; 4. "Thailand 2024 foreign tourist arrivals at 35.5 million". Reuters. 27 January 2025.; 5. "Visitor arrivals for the whole year of 2024". DSEC Macao. 21 January 2025.; 6. "Saudi Arabia reports 29.7 million international visitors in 2024". Argaam (citing Ministry of Tourism). 22 June 2025.; 7. "Malaysia reports just over 25 million international tourists in 2024". Reuters. 5 February 2025.; 8. "Dubai Welcomes 18.72 Million International Visitors (2024)". Dubai DET. 2025.; 9. "VNAT: More than 17.5 million international visitors in 2024". Vietnam National Administration of Tourism (VNAT). 7 January 2025.; 10. "KTO: South Korea welcomed 16.37 million foreign visitors in 2024". The Korea Herald. 6 February 2025.)	2023 (Note: Official 2023 (Asia) data from national tourism authorities and government publications: 1. "Number of China's Exit-Entry Personnel Exceeds 424 Million in 2023 (incl. 35.478 million foreign nationals)". National Immigration Administration (China). 22 January 2024.; 2. "HKTB Announces 34 Million Full-Year Visitor Arrivals in 2023" (PDF). Hong Kong Tourism Board. 13 January 2024.; 3. "JNTO: 25.07 million international visitors in 2023". Travel Voice (JNTO data). 23 January 2024.; 4. "Bank of Thailand MPR: 28.2 million foreign tourists in 2023" (PDF). Bank of Thailand. 10 June 2024.; 5. "Tourism Statistics 2023 (Q4): Full-year visitor arrivals". DSEC Macao. 2024.; 6. "UN Tourism applauds Saudi Arabia's milestone – 27 million international in 2023". UN Tourism. 26 February 2024.; 7. "Malaysia Tourism Key Performance Indicators 2023" (PDF). Tourism Malaysia / MOTAC. 2024.; 8. "Dubai Annual Tourism Report: 17.15 million visitors in 2023". Dubai DET. 2024.; 9. "International visitors to Viet Nam reach 12.6 million in 2023". VNAT. 1 January 2024.; 10. "KTO: 11.03 million foreign tourists in 2023". Korea.net (KTO). 31 January 2024.)	2022 (Note: Official 2022 (Asia) data from national tourism agencies and statistical offices: 1. "HKTB: 2022 Full-Year Arrivals" (PDF). Hong Kong Tourism Board. 16 January 2023.; 2. "Japan records 3.8 million foreign visitors in 2022". Xinhua. 18 January 2023.; 3. "Thailand beats 2022 tourism target with 11.15 million arrivals". Reuters. 24 January 2023.; 4. "Visitor arrivals for 2022". Gov. of Macao SAR. 20 January 2023.; 5. "UNWTO: Saudi Arabia 16.6 million in 2022". Arabian Business. 17 May 2023.; 6. "Malaysia recorded 10.07 million tourist arrivals in 2022". Tourism Malaysia. 2023.; 7. "Annual Visitor Report 2022". Dubai DET. 2023.; 8. "Viet Nam welcomed 3.66 million international visitors in 2022". VNAT. 3 January 2023.; 9. "Foreign tourist arrivals rebounded to 3.2 million in 2022". The Korea Times. 30 January 2024.)
China	64.9	35.5	―
Hong Kong	45.0	34.0	0.6
Japan	36.9	25.1	3.8
Thailand	35.5	28.2	11.2
Macau	34.9	28.2	5.7
Saudi Arabia	29.7	27.0	16.6
Malaysia	25.0	20.1	10.1
United Arab Emirates	18.72	17.15	14.36
Vietnam	17.5	12.6	3.7
South Korea	16.4	11.0	3.2

=== Europe ===
In 2025, there were 793.5 million international tourist arrivals to Europe, an increase of 3.8% over 2024. Top 10 destinations of the last four years were:

International tourist arrivals (in millions)
Destination	2025	2024	2023	2022
France	Pending	102.0	100.0	93.2
Spain	96.8	93.8	85.2	71.6
Turkey	62	60.6	55.2	50.5
Italy	61.5	57.9	57.3	49.9
United Kingdom	Pending	41.8	37.2	30.7
Greece	38.0	36.0	32.7	27.8
Germany	Pending	37.5	34.8	28.4
Austria	33.5	31.9	30.9	26.2
Portugal	Pending	29.0	26.5	22.2
Netherlands	22.4	21.2	20.3	16.1

== International tourism receipts ==
International tourism receipts are the earnings a country makes from foreign visitors' spending on goods and services during their stay, such as expenditures accommodation, food and drink, and shopping. In 2025, the top destinations were:

International tourism receipts (US$billions)
Region	2025	% Change (local currency) (2024 to 2025)	2024	2023	% Change (local currency) (2023 to 2024)
United States	213.0	▼ –0.3%	215.0	189.1	▲13.7%
Spain	113.8	▲6.9%	106.5	92.0	▲15.8%
United Kingdom	89.6	▲7.8%	84.5	73.4	▲15.1%
France	84.0	▲9.0%	77.1	71.2	▲8.3%
Japan	64.0	▲17.7%	54.7	38.6	▲38.1%
Italy	61.4	▲4.6%	58.7	55.9	▲5.0%
Turkey	60.0	▲28.2%	56.3	50.1	▲12.4%
United Arab Emirates	Pending	Pending	57.0	51.9	▲9.7%
Australia	55.4	▲6.6%	52.0	46.1	▲12.4%
China	55.2	▲37.3%	40.2	25.0	▲60.5%
Canada	51.3	▼ –0.1%	51.4	44.8	▲14.8%

== International tourism expenditure ==
The top ten spenders on international tourism for 2025 were:

International tourism expenditure (US$ billion)
Country	2025	2024	2023	2022
China	254	250.6	196.5	114.8
United States	191.7	177.8	150.0	114.9
Germany	Pending	124.9	111.9	89.4
United Kingdom	111.5	103.2	99.5	80.3
France	Pending	59.8	56.0	46.6
Russia	49.3	38.8	34.8	20.8
Australia	47.8	45.9	42.4	19.6
Canada	42.9	43.4	38.3	24.4
Italy	Pending	35.7	34.2	26.5
India	Pending	35.0	33.3	25.9

== See also ==
- List of cities by international visitors
- Tourism
- World Travel Monitor
