= List of cities by international visitors =

This is a list of the top 100 cities ranked by the number of international visitors, including all international arrivals by land, air, and sea, for tourist or business purposes. The consulting firm Euromonitor and the financial services corporation Mastercard define the concept of the foreign visitor differently, thus their respective rankings differ.

Euromonitor counts a visitor as any person visiting a city in another country for at least 24 hours, for a period not exceeding 12 months, and staying in paid or unpaid, collective or private accommodation. Each arrival is counted separately and includes people traveling more than once a year and people visiting several cities during one trip. The growth column compares international arrivals to the previous year.

Mastercard Global Destinations Cities Index counts a visitor only if a person stayed overnight at least once in the city. The income column shows the amount visitors spent in each city. For cities bordering directly on foreign territory, border crossings from country to country are not counted as international visitors.

== 2025 top 10 ranking ==
The top 10 most visited cities in 2025 according to Euromonitor were:

Rank	City	Country / Territory	Arrivals 2025 (in million)	Growth
1	Bangkok	Thailand	30.3	-7%
2	Hong Kong	Hong Kong	23.2	6%
3	London	United Kingdom	22.7	4%
4	Macau	Macau	20.4	14%
5	Istanbul	Turkey	19.7	6%
6	Dubai	United Arab Emirates	19.5	7%
7	Mecca	Saudi Arabia	18.7	7%
8	Antalya	Turkey	18.6	8%
9	Paris	France	18.3	4%
10	Kuala Lumpur	Malaysia	17.3	5%

== 2024 ==
The top 10 most visited cities in 2024 according to Euromonitor were:

Rank	City	Country / Territory	Arrivals 2024	Growth in arrivals
1	Bangkok	Thailand	32,400,000	37%
2	Istanbul	Turkey	23,000,000	14%
3	London	United Kingdom	21,700,000	7%
4	Hong Kong	Hong Kong	20,500,000	19%
5	Mecca	Saudi Arabia	19,300,000	20%
6	Antalya	Turkey	19,300,000	17%
7	Dubai	United Arab Emirates	18,200,000	8%
8	Macau	Macau	18,000,000	26%
9	Paris	France	17,400,000	2%
10	Kuala Lumpur	Malaysia	16,500,000	73%

== 2023 ==
The top 10 most visited cities in 2023 according to Euromonitor were:

Rank	City	Country / Territory	Arrivals 2023	Growth in arrivals
1	Istanbul	Turkey	20,200,000	26%
2	London	United Kingdom	18,800,000	17%
3	Dubai	United Arab Emirates	16,800,000	18%
4	Antalya	Turkey	16,500,000	29%
5	Paris	France	15,500,000	4%
6	Hong Kong	Hong Kong	14,700,000	2,495%
7	Bangkok	Thailand	12,200,000	142%
8	New York City	United States	11,700,000	24%
9	Cancún	Mexico	10,800,000	13%
10	Mecca	Saudi Arabia	10,800,000	124%

== 2016/2018 top 100 rankings ==
The 100 most visited cities in 2016/2018 according to Euromonitor and Mastercard were:

Rank (Euromonitor)	Rank (Mastercard)	City	Country / Territory	Arrivals 2018 (Euromonitor)	Arrivals 2016 (Mastercard)	Growth in arrivals (Euromonitor)	Income (billions $) (Mastercard)
1	11	Hong Kong	Hong Kong	29,262,700	8,370,000	5.0%	6.84
2	1	Bangkok	Thailand	24,177,500	21,470,000	7.7%	14.84
3	2	London	United Kingdom	19,233,000	19,880,000	−3.0%	19.76
4		Macau	Macau	18,931,400		9.2%	
5	6	Singapore	Singapore	18,551,200	12,110,000	5.3%	12.54
6	3	Paris	France	17,560,200	18,030,000	10.9%	12.88
7	4	Dubai	United Arab Emirates	15,920,700	15,270,000	0.8%	31.30
8	5	New York City	United States	13,600,000	12,750,000	3.8%	18.52
9	7	Kuala Lumpur	Malaysia	13,434,300	12,020,000	4.6%	11.34
10	8	Istanbul	Turkey	13,433,000	11,950,000	25.2%	7.54
11	48	Delhi	India	12,645,300	2,580,000	24.5%	1.91
12		Antalya	Turkey	12,438,800		31.2%	
13	54	Shenzhen	China	12,202,100	2,120,000	1.1%	0.83
14	27	Mumbai	India	10,590,100	4,860,000	17.9%	3.60
15		Phuket	Thailand	10,550,700		4.4%	
16	16	Rome	Italy	10,065,400	7,120,000	5.6%	4.47
17	9	Tokyo	Japan	9,985,100	11,700,000	4.6%	13.48
18		Pattaya	Thailand	9,606,400		5.1%	
19	15	Taipei	Taiwan	9,597,800	7,350,000	3.5%	9.60
20		Mecca	Saudi Arabia	9,565,200		−2.4%	
21	36	Guangzhou	China	9,004,800	3,700,000	0.0%	1.66
22	20	Prague	Czech Republic	8,948,600	5,810,000	1.6%	2.70
23		Medina	Saudi Arabia	8,547,200		−2.4%	
24	10	Seoul	South Korea	8,431,400	10,200,000	10.1%	12.30
25	13	Amsterdam	Netherlands	8,354,200	8,000,000	6.5%	4.20
26		Agra	India	8,138,200		22.5%	
27	24	Miami	United States	8,121,300	5,240,000	4.1%	8.15
28	17	Osaka	Japan	7,861,500	7,020,000	19.0%	3.39
29	21	Los Angeles	United States	7,500,000	5,600,000	4.7%	8.10
30	19	Shanghai	China	7,483,500	6,120,000	4.0%	5.00
31	42	Ho Chi Minh City	Vietnam	7,200,000	3,050,000	15.4%	3.12
32		Denpasar	Indonesia	7,185,600		15.2%	
33	12	Barcelona	Spain	6,714,500	8,200,000	6.8%	9.28
34		Las Vegas	United States	6,591,300		−1.4%	
35	14	Milan	Italy	6,481,300	7,650,000	2.1%	4.56
36	30	Chennai	India	6,422,800	4,370,000	26.3%	3.24
37	18	Vienna	Austria	6,410,300	6,690,000	3.6%	4.54
38		Johor Bahru	Malaysia	6,396,000		14.8%	
39		Jaipur	India	6,383,400		20.7%	
40		Cancún	Mexico	6,041,000		0.0%	
41	26	Berlin	Germany	5,959,400	4,940,000	5.9%	5.00
42	67	Cairo	Egypt	5,754,500	1,550,000	31.1%	1.08
43	46	Athens	Greece	5,728,400	2,680,000	19.4%	1.62
44		Orlando	United States	5,553,600		5.4%	
45	59	Moscow	Russia	5,510,000	1,830,000	14.8%	0.94
46		Venice	Italy	5,502,500		3.5%	
47	22	Madrid	Spain	5,440,100	5,260,000	3.2%	8.02
48		Ha Long	Vietnam	5,294,800		22.0%	
49	28	Riyadh	Saudi Arabia	5,267,500	4,590,000	−2.4%	1.69
50	25	Dublin	Ireland	5,213,400	4,970,000	4.6%	1.87
51		Florence	Italy	5,059,900		2.4%	
52	52	Hanoi	Vietnam	4,687,000	2,200,000	9.0%	1.28
53	29	Toronto	Canada	4,510,300	4,520,000	5.2%	2.16
54	39	Johannesburg	South Africa	4,120,800	3,600,000	1.3%	1.73
55	35	Sydney	Australia	4,090,600	3,750,000	3.2%	6.40
56	23	Munich	Germany	4,066,600	5,250,000	6.2%	5.32
57	66	Jakarta	Indonesia	4,033,000	1,550,000	12.4%	1.19
58	31	Beijing	China	4,002,400	4,050,000	2.0%	4.08
59	85	Saint Petersburg	Russia	3,996,000	990,000	11.0%	0.51
60	45	Brussels	Belgium	3,942,000	2,710,000	14.9%	1.92
61		Jerusalem	Israel; Palestine	3,930,000		11.6%	
62	40	Budapest	Hungary	3,822,800	3,360,000	4.6%	0.95
63	37	Lisbon	Portugal	3,539,400	3,630,000	0.5%	1.43
64		Dammam	Saudi Arabia	3,498,900		−2.4%	
65		Penang Island	Malaysia	3,437,100		7.6%	
66		Heraklion	Greece	3,371,800		7.1%	
67		Kyoto	Japan	3,294,200		3.0%	
68		Zhuhai	China	3,259,700		2.4%	
69	34	Vancouver	Canada	3,212,100	3,900,000	7.1%	2.12
70		Chiang Mai	Thailand	3,196,000		2.1%	
71	65	Copenhagen	Denmark	3,069,700	1,630,000	3.6%	0.91
72	33	San Francisco	United States	2,901,000	3,930,000	0.0%	5.93
73	47	Melbourne	Australia	2,889,000	2,650,000	5.8%	4.94
74		Krakow	Poland	2,850,000		1.8%	
75		Marrakesh	Morocco	2,838,100		6.3%	
76	62	Kolkata	India	2,826,500	1,720,000	10.4%	1.27
77		Cebu City	Philippines	2,805,100		24.9%	
78		Auckland	New Zealand	2,798,900		5.0%	
79	86	Tel Aviv	Israel	2,777,000	990,000	7.9%	1.31
80		Guilin	China	2,747,000		10.4%	
81		Honolulu	United States	2,737,300		1.9%	
82		Hurghada	Egypt	2,735,700		46.8%	
83	72	Warsaw	Poland	2,732,000	1,370,000	3.9%	0.51
84		Muğla	Turkey	2,723,800		37.4%	
85	57	Buenos Aires	Argentina	2,685,700	2,020,000	5.2%	1.69
86		Chiba	Japan	2,683,900		10.4%	
87	38	Frankfurt	Germany	2,636,000	3,620,000	5.6%	3.67
88	56	Stockholm	Sweden	2,604,600	2,080,000	5.3%	1.68
89	32	Lima	Peru	2,535,400	4,030,000	8.0%	1.44
90		Da Nang	Vietnam	2,505,000		25.0%	
91		Batam	Indonesia	2,492,600		11.9%	
92		Nice	France	2,466,800		6.0%	
93		Fukuoka	Japan	2,436,900		20.3%	
94	41	Abu Dhabi	United Arab Emirates	2,402,800	3,140,000	7.1%	2.65
95		Jeju	South Korea	2,349,200		−3.3%	
96		Porto	Portugal	2,341,300		4.9%	
97		Rhodes	Greece	2,337,700		7.3%	
98	71	Rio de Janeiro	Brazil	2,278,300	1,370,000	1.2%	0.97
99		Krabi	Thailand	2,255,300		6.5%	
100	97	Bangalore	India	2,239,200	740,000	25.7%	0.55
	43	Mexico City	Mexico		2,980,000		2.27
	44	Punta Cana	Dominican Republic		2,730,000		2.95
	49	São Paulo	Brazil		2,300,000		1.50
	50	Zürich	Switzerland		2,240,000		2.23
	51	Montreal	Canada		2,240,000		1.08
	53	Washington D.C.	United States		2,180,000		2.54
	55	Chicago	United States		2,080,000		2.95
	58	Düsseldorf	Germany		1,950,000		1.98
	60	Boston	United States		1,740,000		2.18
	61	Chengdu	China		1,740,000		0.60
	63	Edinburgh	United Kingdom		1,660,000		1.13
	64	San Jose	United States		1,630,000		0.86
	68	Tehran	Iran		1,520,000		0.31
	69	Houston	United States		1,500,000		2.48
	70	Hamburg	Germany		1,450,000		1.47
	73	Cape Town	South Africa		1,370,000		1.00
	74	Manila	Philippines		1,320,000		0.98
	75	Bogota	Colombia		1,260,000		1.35
	76	Xi'an	China		1,210,000		0.63
	77	Beirut	Lebanon		1,160,000		1.12
	78	Geneva	Switzerland		1,150,000		1.14
	79	Colombo	Sri Lanka		1,130,000		0.95
	80	Xiamen	China		1,090,000		0.93
	81	Bucharest	Romania		1,050,000		0.31
	82	Casablanca	Morocco		1,050,000		0.62
	83	Atlanta	United States		1,020,000		1.47
	84	Sofia	Bulgaria		1,010,000		0.44
	87	Dalian	China		940,000		0.55
	88	Montevideo	Uruguay		930,000		0.55
	89	Amman	Jordan		930,000		0.94
	90	Hangzhou	China		900,000		0.43
	91	Pune	India		900,000		0.66
	92	Durban	South Africa		830,000		0.29
	93	Dallas/Fort Worth	United States		780,000		1.13
	94	Accra	Ghana		760,000		0.53
	95	Quito	Ecuador		750,000		0.42
	96	Tianjin	China		750,000		2.24
	98	Qingdao	China		730,000		0.53
	99	Philadelphia	United States		720,000		1.05
	100	Lagos	Nigeria		710,000		0.16

== See also ==
- Global city
- World Tourism rankings
