= Dawar, Jammu and Kashmir =

Dawar
- Village
- Location in Jammu and Kashmir, India Dawar (India)
- Coordinates: 34.63°N 74.82°E
- Country: India
- Union Territory: Jammu and Kashmir
- District: Bandipora
- Tehsil: Gurez

Population (2011)
  - Total: 4,253

Languages
  - Official: Kashmiri, Urdu, Hindi, Dogri, English
  - Spoken: Kashmiri
- Time zone: UTC+5:30 (IST)
- PIN: 193503

Dawar is a village in Gurez Tehsil in Bandipora district of Jammu and Kashmir.

== Demographics ==
According to the 2011 census of India, Dawar has 506 households. The literacy rate of Dawar village was 86.80% compared to 67.16% of Jammu and Kashmir. In Dawar, Male literacy stands at 92.63% while the female literacy rate was 71.18%.

Demographics (2011 Census)
	Total	Male	Female
Population	4253	3038	1215
Children aged below 6 years	306	163	143
Scheduled caste	2	2	0
Scheduled tribe	2432	1284	1148
Literacy	86.80%	92.63%	71.15%
Workers (all)	2471	2226	245
Main workers (total)	1854	–	–
Marginal workers (total)	617	467	150

== Transport ==
=== Road ===
Dawar is connected by road with other places in Jammu and Kashmir and India by the Kanzalawn-Dawar Road and Bandipora-Gurez Road.

=== Rail ===
The nearest railway stations to Dawar are Sopore railway station and Baramulla railway station located at a distance of 114 and 124 kilometres respectively.

=== Air ===
The nearest helipad is at Markoot Village at a distance of 2 km (1.2 mi), and the nearest international airport is Srinagar International Airport located at a distance of 145 km (90 mi) and is a 5-hour drive.

== See also ==
- Jammu and Kashmir
- Gurez
- Bandipore
