= Mangnipora =

Mangnipora Murad Pora
- Village
- Location in Jammu and Kashmir, India Mangnipora (India)
- Coordinates: 34°25′33″N 74°35′4″E
- Country: India
- Union Territory: Jammu and Kashmir
- District: Bandipora
- Tehsil: Aloosa

Government
  - Type: Gram Panchayat
  - Sarpanch: NA
  - District Development Council: Kaunser Shafeeq

Area
  - Total: 436.3 ha (1,078 acres)
- Elevation: 1,578 m (5,177 ft)

Population (2011)
  - Total: 4,021
- Demonym(s): Mangniporaya, Mangniporayian, Mangniporuk

Official Languages
  - Official: Kashmiri, Urdu, Hindi, Dogri, English

Languages Spoken
  - Spoken: Kashmiri, Urdu, English
- Time zone: UTC+05:30 (IST)
- PIN: 193505
- Area code: 01957
- Vehicle registration: JK15
- Census of India Village-code: 002744

Mangnipora is a village in Aloosa Tehsil in Bandipora District of Jammu & Kashmir.

== Transport ==
=== Road ===
Mangnipora is connected by road with other places in Jammu and Kashmir and India by the Srinagar-Bandipora Road, Sopore-Bandipora Road, etc.

=== Rail ===
The nearest railway stations to Mangnipora are Sopore Railway Station and Srinagar Railway Station, located 26 and 73 kilometers from Mangnipora respectively.

=== Air ===
The nearest airport is Srinagar International Airport located 69 km from Mangnipora.

== Demographics ==
Total Households	627
Total Murad Pora (Mangni Pora) Village Population	4021
Total Male Population	2084
Total Female Population	1937
Sex Ratio	107.58905524006

== Culture ==
See: Culture of Kashmir

== See also ==
- Patushay
- Bandipora
- Gurez Valley
- Wullar Lake
- Qazipora Patushi
- Harmukh
- Kashmir
