= Watapora =

Zurbaf Pora Watpor Watapora
- Village
- Location in Jammu and Kashmir, India Zurbaf Pora (India)
- Coordinates: 34°25′9″N 74°36′36″E
- Country: India
- Union Territory: Jammu and Kashmir
- District: Bandipora

Government
  - Type: Gram Panchayat
  - Sarpanch: NA
  - District Development Council: Kaunser Shafeeq

Area
  - Total: 133.2 ha (329 acres)
- Elevation: 1,578 m (5,177 ft)

Population (2011)
  - Total: 3,786
- Demonym(s): Watporaya, Watporayian, Watporuk

Official Languages
  - Official: Kashmiri, Urdu, Hindi, Dogri, English

Languages Spoken
  - Spoken: Kashmiri, Urdu, English
- Time zone: UTC+05:30 (IST)
- PIN: 193502
- Area code: 01957
- Vehicle registration: JK15
- Census of India Village-code: 002751

Zurbaf Pora alternatively known as Watapora is a village in Bandipora District of Jammu & Kashmir.

== Transport ==
=== Road ===
Zurbaf Pora is connected by road with other places in Jammu and Kashmir and India by the Srinagar-Bandipora Road, Sopore-Bandipora Road, etc.

=== Rail ===
The nearest railway stations to Zurbaf Pora are Sopore Railway Station and Srinagar Railway Station, located 26 and 73 kilometers from Zurbaf Pora respectively.

=== Air ===
The nearest airport is Srinagar International Airport located 69 km from Zurbaf Pora.

== Demographics ==
Particulars	Total	Male	Female
Total Population	3,786	1,971	1,815
Literate Population	2,032	1,215	817
Illiterate Population	1,754	756	998

== Culture ==
See: Culture of Kashmir

== See also ==
- Patushay
- Bandipora
- Gurez Valley
- Wullar Lake
- Qazipora Patushi
- Harmukh
- Kashmir
