= 2017 North Indian cold wave =

Weather event in India

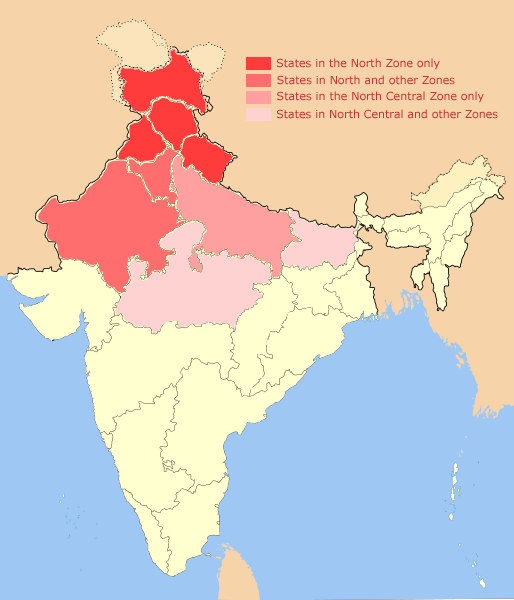
- North India zonal map

Meteorological history
- Formed: 3 January 2017

Cold wave
- Lowest temp: −12.4 °C (9.7 °F)

Overall effects
- Casualties: At least 16 in North India due to cold weather, another 25 due to avalanches in Kashmir
- Areas affected: North India, Kashmir Valley

North India was devastated by a cold wave during the month of January 2017. This occurrence had a severe effect on several North Indian states, including Himachal Pradesh, Jammu and Kashmir, Punjab, Haryana, Rajasthan, and Uttar Pradesh. The lowest temperature in Gulmarg due to the cold wave was recorded at −12.4 °C (9.7 °F). The banks of Dal Lake in Srinagar froze. Keylong of Himachal Pradesh and Kargil of Jammu and Kashmir witnessed low temperatures of −13.9 °C (7.0 °F).

Several army camps in Kashmir bound sectors were damaged and many people died in avalanches in Kashmir districts near the Line of Control during the last few days of January 2017.

== Effect ==
The minimum temperatures in some parts of North Indian states fell below freezing, with rainfall and snowfall. Parts of Gujarat and Madhya Pradesh were affected by the cold wave, with a fall in temperatures at night. Due to intense fog and lack of visibility, several trains running through North India were delayed and rescheduled. Seven people in Shimla lost their lives due to the cold wave. Nine people died in parts of Uttar Pradesh, capital Lucknow where the temperature fell to 0.1 °C (32.2 °F). Three people died due to fog related accidents in North India.

India's capital New Delhi witnessed minimum temperatures of 3.4 °C (38.1 °F). Several schools of Noida and Delhi were closed, due to the severity of the cold wave. The western disturbances which creates an upper air cyclonic circulation over Jammu and Kashmir caused rainfall in Chandigarh, which was recorded by India Meteorological Department as the heaviest rainfall in Chandigarh in the last 22 years.

=== Kashmir avalanches ===
India Jammu and Kashmir location map

Five people including an army officer, died in an avalanche in Kashmir. Four members of a family were killed in avalanches in the Ganderbal and Bandipora districts of Kashmir. One army officer died due to an avalanche on an army camp at Sonamarg. Fifteen Indian soldiers died and several soldiers went missing due to three avalanches that hit the Gurez and Kupwara Sectors of Kashmir, Bandipora district near the Line of Control on 26 January 2017.

A rescue team operated immediately to search for missing soldiers and helped the civilians evacuate from snowfall and avalanche-prone villages of Gurez to safer areas. The rescue operations by Indian Army, saved five army personnel trapped under snow by the avalanche that had hit the Army post in Kupwara district. All five later succumbed to their injuries while recuperating in hospitals. Three corpses of victims were retrieved during the rescue operations in the Gurez sector.
