= Ahmi Sharief =

Ahmi Sharief Ahamsharief
- Village
- Country: India
- Union Territory: Jammu and Kashmir
- District: Bandipora

Population (2011)
  - Total: 1,535

Languages
  - Official: Kashmiri, Urdu, Hindi, Dogri, English
- Time zone: UTC+5:30 (IST)
- Vehicle registration: JK-15

Ahmi Sharief also known as Ahamsharief, is a village located in Bandipora tehsil of Bandipora district, Jammu and Kashmir, India. The village has total population of 1535 of which 802 are males while 733 are females.
