= Mustafa Ibn Jameel =

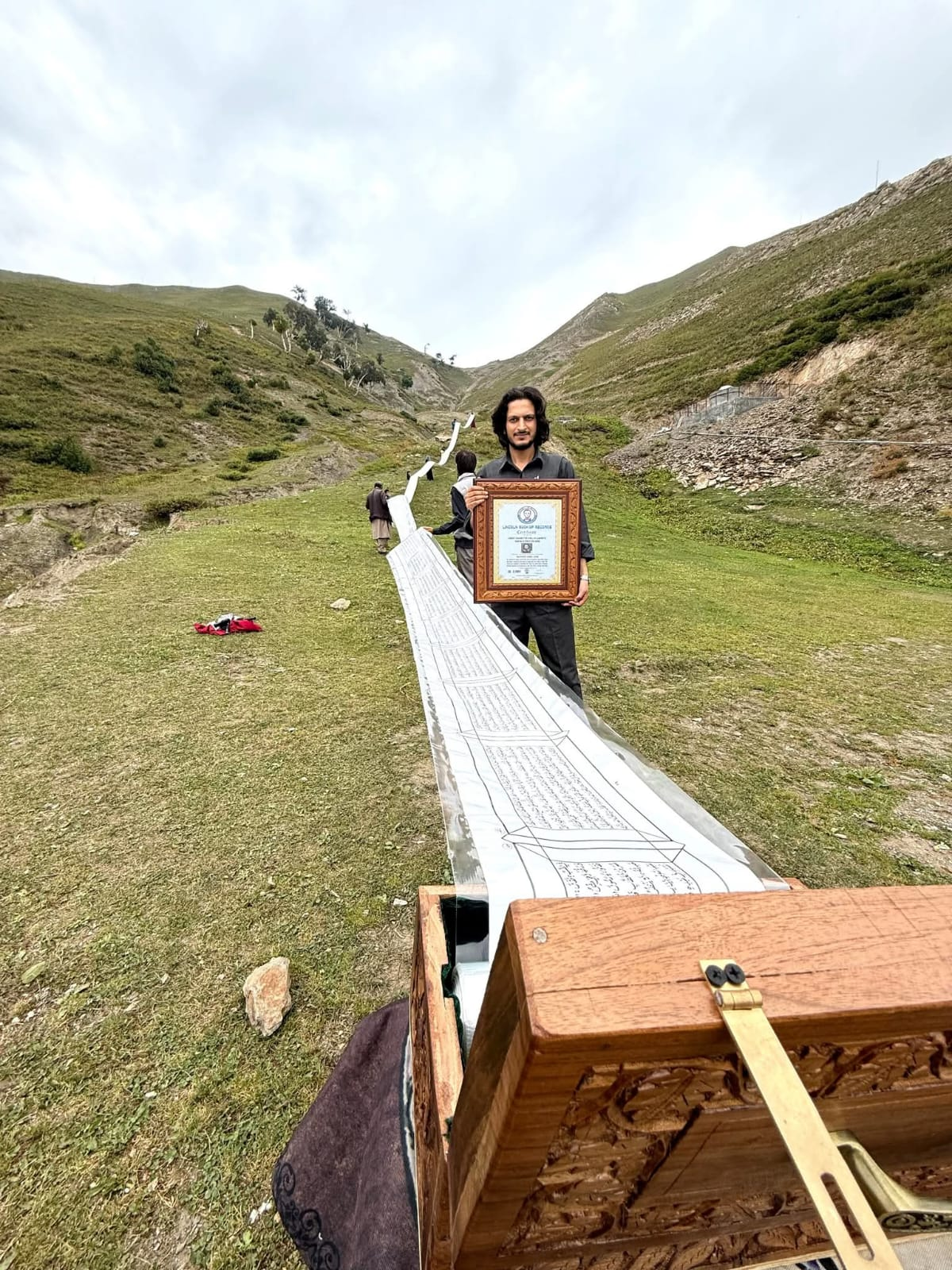
- Mustafa displaying his 1.3 km scroll of Imam Malik Ibn Anas's Al-Muwatta, in Gurez, Circa 25 August 2025
- Born: Mustafa Ibn Jameel; 1996 (age 29–30); Gurez, Jammu & Kashmir
- Known for: Calligraphy

Mustafa Ibn Jameel (born c. 1996) is a self-taught Kashmiri Calligrapher from Tulail, in the Gurez valley of Bandipora district of Jammu and Kashmir (union territory) in India. He is known for hand-writing the complete Holy Quran on a continuous 500-metre paper scroll in the Naskh script, and for subsequently producing a 1.3-kilometre handwritten scroll of Al-Muwatta, the foundational hadith collection of Imam Malik ibn Anas. Both works were recognised by the Lincoln Book of Records.

== Biography ==
Mustafa grew up in the remote Gurez valley, a Shina-speaking region along the Line of Control in northern Kashmir known for its geographic isolation. He received no formal training in Calligraphy, teaching himself the craft through books and sustained independent practice. His original motivation was modest: he wished to improve his handwriting. Over time the practice deepened into a devotional commitment to the art of the sacred script.

His early scrolls attracted local attention, and he gradually developed the technical command and logistical ambition required for large-scale projects. He sourced specialist calligraphic paper from a factory in Delhi, as no suitable material was available in Kashmir, and also procured a dedicated calligraphic ink for his work.

== Works ==
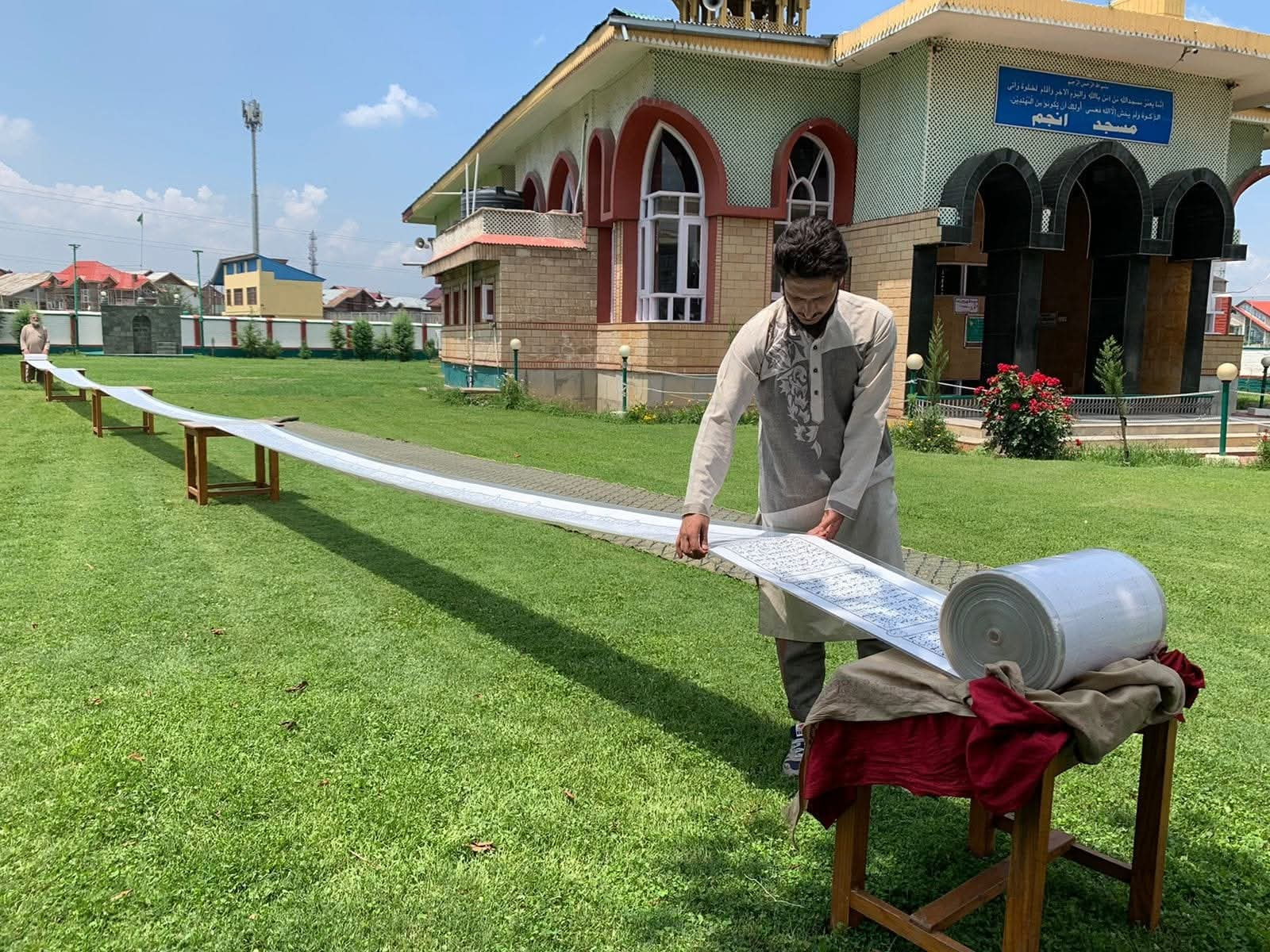
Mustafa Displaying his longest Quran scroll (500 mt) at Anjum Mosque Srinagar c.2022

Mustafa's most documented work is a complete handwritten Quran rendered in Naskh script on a single paper scroll 500 metres in length, completed in June 2022. The project began the previous year; procurement of materials took two months, the calligraphic writing took three, and the border decoration, composed of approximately 1.3 million individually drawn dots took one further month. The scroll, 14.5 inches wide and covering 450 pages, was laminated upon completion. The total cost of the project, finished in Delhi, was approximately ₹2.5 lakh. During intensive phases, Mustafa worked approximately 18 hours a day.

He subsequently completed a 1.3-kilometre scroll of Al-Muwatta, one of the earliest written collections of hadith and Islamic jurisprudence, compiled by Imam Malik ibn Anas in the eighth century. This work has been described as the longest handwritten hadith scroll ever created. Both the Quran scroll and the hadith scroll were recognised by the Chennai-based Lincoln Book of Records, an independent organisation established to recognise and promote exceptional talent.

Beyond record-setting works, Mustafa has conducted calligraphy workshops in schools and community centres in the Bandipora area. He has expressed a wish to establish a dedicated calligraphy school in his hometown, with the aim of making the art accessible to young people, particularly girls, regardless of financial background.

== Recognition and media coverage ==
The 500-metre Quran scroll attracted wide national and international press attention upon its public disclosure in July 2022, with coverage in The Print, Rediff, WION, Scroll.in, News18, Times Now, Dhaka Tribune, The Daily Star (Bangladesh), Shia Waves, Al Bawaba, and The Cognate. Video reports were produced by BBC Urdu, BBC Hindi, Reuters, and Al Jazeera English. His hadith scroll project was subsequently covered by Morning Kashmir and KNS Kashmir, and a dedicated video report was published.
