= Tulail Valley =

Valley in Jammu and Kashmir, India

- "Telail"
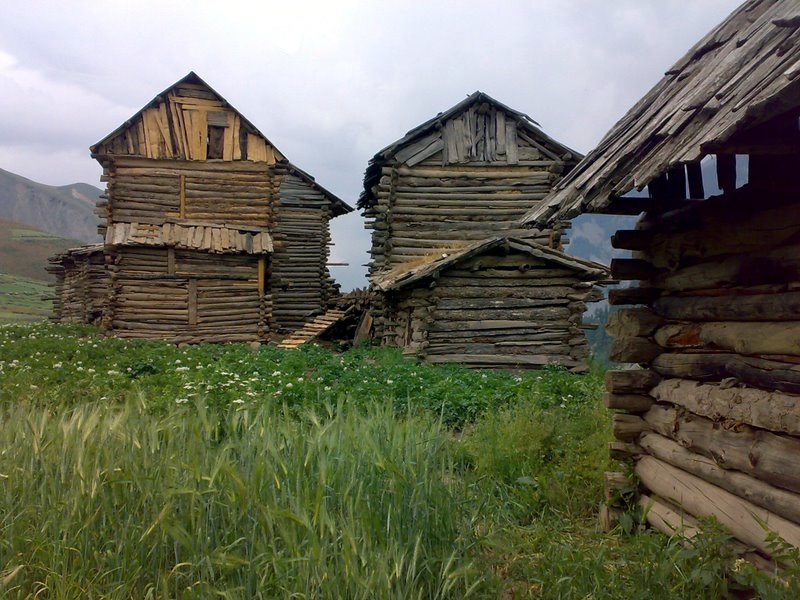
- Wooden houses in Tulail

- Location within Jammu and Kashmir
- Floor elevation: 2750
- Length: 40 mi (64 km)
- Width: 0.6 mi (0.97 km)

Geography
- Location: Gurez, Bandipora, Jammu and Kashmir, India
- Borders on: Drass (East); Gurez (West); Astore (North); Sind Valley (South))
- Coordinates: 34°33′22″N 75°03′15″E
- River: Kishanganga River
- Interactive map of Tulail Valley

The Tulail Valley is a Himalayan sub-valley of Gurez drained by the Kishanganga river in the union territory of Jammu and Kashmir in India, a region disputed between India and Pakistan. The Valley lies 120 kilometres (75 mi) northeast of Bandipora and 200 kilometres (120 mi) from Srinagar the summer capital of Jammu and Kashmir. Tulail Valley lies immediate east of the Gurez Valley.

== Geography ==
The Tulail Valley is situated at an average altitude of 2,750 m (9,020 ft). Tulail, with its headquarter at Badugam town, is one of the tehsils of Bandipora district. It is bordered by the Gurez Valley in the west, Mushkoh Valley and Drass town in the east, the Kashmir Valley in the south, and across Line of control in the north is Astore District in Pakistan-administrated Gilgit-Baltistan(GB). Tulail Valley is formed by the east to west flowing Kishanganga River which originates from the Krishansar Lake in the alpine meadows north of Sonamarg. Badugam is the central town of Tulail Valley. The other main villages of the valley include Burnai, Badoab, Niru and Sheikhpora. Going east from Gurez town towards Dras, the first and the last villages of Tulail Valley are Burnai and Checkwali.

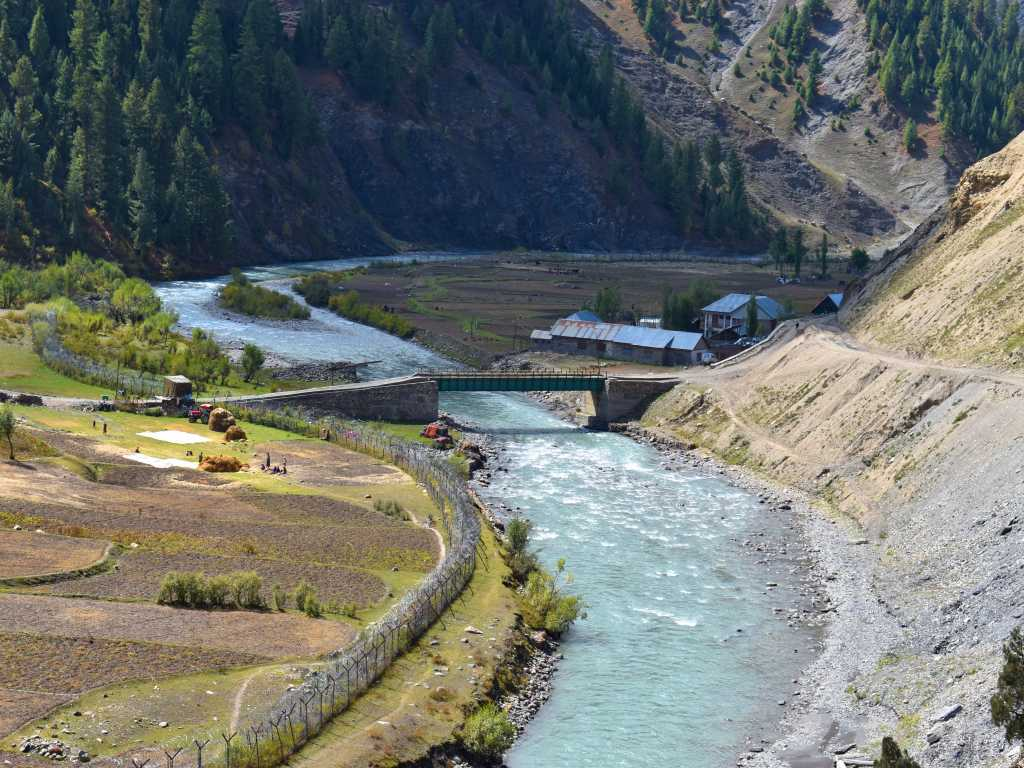
A river sight from Gurez-Tulail Valley

== Demography ==
Gurez and Tulail valleys are primarily inhabited by people of the Shina tribe, who are largely Muslim.

== Internet ==
Tulail Valley is one of the remotest valleys of Jammu and Kashmir. The Valley got cellular connectivity and the internet in December 2020 for the first time.

== Transport ==
Bandipore-Gurez-Badugam-Dras Highway: Tulail Valley is connected by a 200 km paved motorable road which leads from Srinagar through Bandipore, Razdan Pass and Gurez town to Badugam. The road from Tulail Valley and Gurez Valley remains cut off from the Bandipora town for six months every year due to heavy snowfall at Razdan Pass. The Valley is also connected with Drass by a motorable road over Kabul Gali pass and Mushkoh Valley. However the road is only used by Indian Army. No local or a private vehicle is allowed to ply on the road due to its close proximity to the militarised Line of Control. Tulail is also connected with main Kashmir valley by hiking trails which lead to Naranag over Satsar Pass and to Sonamarg through Gadsar Lake.

== See also ==
- Geography of Jammu and Kashmir
