= Nazir Ahmad Khan (Indian politician) =

Kashmiri politician (born 1966)

Minister for Animal Husbandry
- In office 2009–2014
- Governor: Narinder Nath Vohra
- Chief Minister: Omar Abdullah

Deputy Speaker of Jammu and Kashmir Legislative Assembly
- In office 2015–2018

Member Jammu and Kashmir Legislative Assembly
- In office 2009–2015
- Governor: Narinder Nath Vohra
- Chief Minister: Omar Abdullah
- Constituency: Gurez

Member Jammu and Kashmir Legislative Assembly
- In office 2002–2008
- Governor: Srinivas Kumar Sinha
- Chief Minister: Mufti Mohammad Sayeed
- Constituency: Gurez

Personal details
- Born: 31 December 1966 (age 59) Gurez, Jammu and Kashmir
- Party: Jammu and Kashmir National Conference
- Parent: Late Hamidullah Khan (father)
- Education: Graduate, Government Degree College, Sopore

Nazir Ahmad Khan also known as Nazir Gurezi (born 31 December 1966) is an Indian politician from Jammu and Kashmir (union territory). He was born in Badwan, Gurez, Bandipora. He is the leader of the Jammu & Kashmir National Conference Party, and has been elected 4 times as the MLA from Gurez Assembly constituency since 2002.

He was serving as the Deputy Speaker of Jammu and Kashmir Legislative Assembly before it was dissolved in 2018 and the state of Jammu & Kashmir ceased to exist on 6 August 2019.

He has also served as the Minister for Jammu and Kashmir Animal and Sheep Husbandry Department from 2008 - 2014, and is the only minister who has represented Gurez in any council of ministers.

== Early life ==
Nazir Ahmad Khan was born to Hamidullah Khan on 31 December 1966. He did his schooling at the Govt. Boys Hr. Sec. School Gurez and then completed his graduation from Govt. Degree College as a sophomore. Being a graduate, he entered politics at a very young age and contested the 1996 Assembly and 1999 parliamentary elections where he lost both. Nazir Gurezi, who left the post of Secretary General in Janata Dal, joined NC. In 2002, he was elected to the Assembly on Jammu & Kashmir National Conference ticket.

Khan won the Gurez seat for the second time in the 2008 Assembly elections after defeating his closest challenger Faqir Mohammad Khan with victory margin of 732 votes. Out of 15,390 votes in Gurez, 11,392 were polled in 2008 with polling percentage at 74.02.

In 2024 elections, he defeated his closest challenger Faqir Mohammad Khan of the BJP with victory margin of 1,132 votes.

== Electoral performance ==
Election	Constituency	Party	Result	Votes %	Opposition Candidate	Opposition Party	Opposition vote %	Ref
2024	Gurez	JKNC	Won	46.64%	Faqeer Mohammad Khan	BJP	40.34%	
2014	Gurez	JKNC	Won	48.29%	Faqeer Mohammad Khan	INC	47.26%	
2008	Gurez	JKNC	Won	51.06%	Faqeer Ahmad Khan	INC	44.64%	
2002	Gurez	JKNC	Won	53.45%	Faqeer Mohammad Khan	Independent	41.90%	

== Detention ==
On the intervening night of 4 and 5 August 2019, Nazir Ahmad Khan was placed under preventive detention by the Indian Government under Section 107 of the CRPC. This came as a backdrop to the government's decision of scrapping Article 370 of the Constitution of India, which gave the state of Jammu & Kashmir semi-autonomous powers. After the 104 days of detention, Gurezi was released by Govt of India.
