= Markoot =

- Village
- Location in Jammu and Kashmir, India Markoot (India)
- Coordinates: 34.6331591°N 74.8477500°E
- Country: India
- Union Territory: Jammu and Kashmir
- District: Bandipora
- Tehsil: Gurez

Population (2011)
  - Total: 2,034

Languages
  - Official: Kashmiri, Urdu, Hindi, Dogri, English
  - Spoken: Shina
- Time zone: UTC+5:30 (IST)
- PIN: 193503

Markoot is a village in Gurez tehsil in Bandipora district of the Indian union territory of Jammu and Kashmir. It was part of ancient Dardistan and was divided in three parts; one among them is Gurez Valley, where the village Markoot lies. Markoot is located at the foot of the Habba Khatoon Mountain. Area-wise Markoot is the biggest village in whole Gurez valley. Markoot actually was ancient capital of Gurez valley.

== Gallery ==
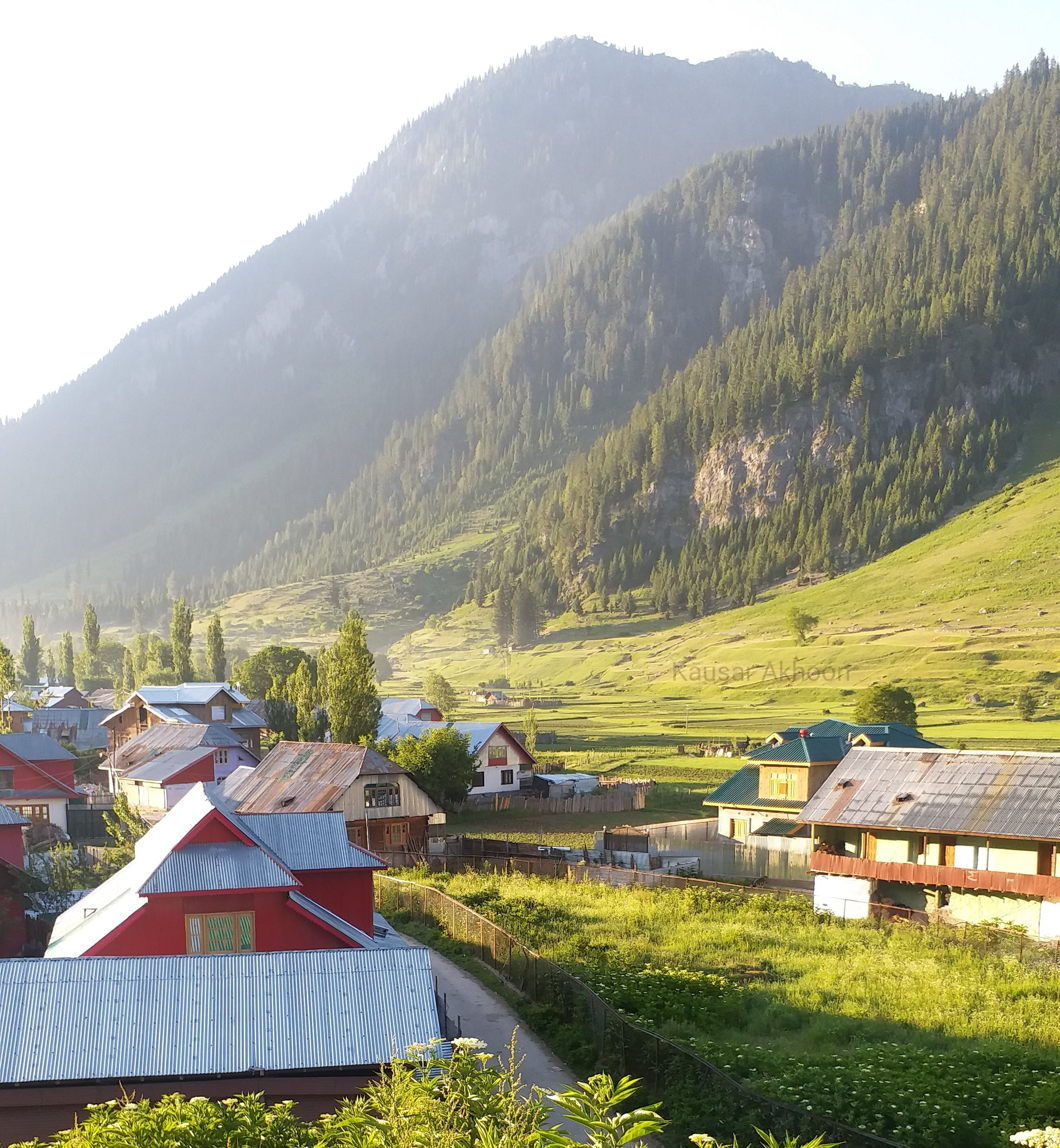
Markoot Village Link Road with Graveyard Fenced

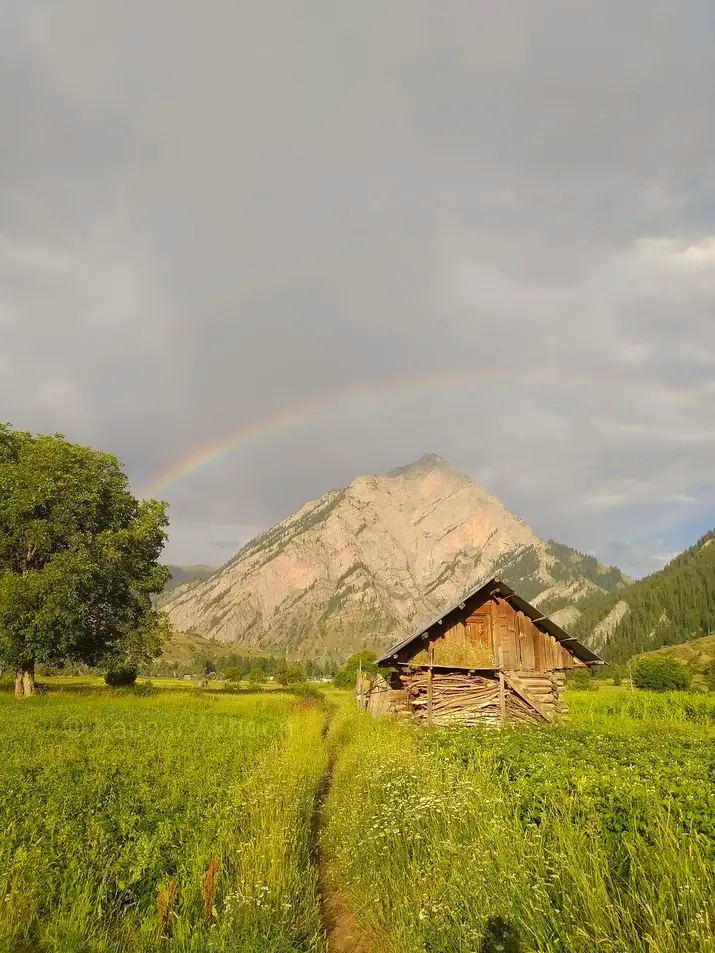
An old traditional wooden hut as seen in the open fields of Markoot Village, Gurez Valley, Indian Administered Kashmir

== Demographics ==
According to the 2011 census of India, Markoot has 261 households. The literacy rate of Markoot village was 76.72% compared to 67.16% of Jammu and Kashmir. In Markoot, male literacy is 86.59% while the female literacy rate is 61.90%.

Demographics (2011 Census)
	Total	Male	Female
Population	2034	1192	842
Children aged below 6 years	406	215	191
Scheduled caste	4	4	0
Scheduled tribe	1800	962	838
Literacy	76.72%	86.59%	61.90%
Workers (all)	601	575	26
Main workers (total)	471	–	–
Marginal workers (total)	130	125	5

== Transport ==
=== Road ===
Markoot is connected by road with other places in Jammu and Kashmir and India by the Bandipora-Gurez Road.

=== Rail ===
The nearest railway stations to Markoot are Sopore railway station and Baramulla railway station located at a distance of 114 and 123 kilometres respectively.

=== Air ===
The nearest helipad is located at Markoot opposite the Police Station Gurez on the banks of Kishan Ganga River. It was built in 2017. The nearest international airport to this village is Srinagar International Airport located at a distance of 145 kilometres and is a 5-hour drive.

== See also ==
- Jammu and Kashmir
- Gurez
- Bandipore
