= Lankreshipora =

Lankreshipora Lankreshipur
- Village
- Location in Jammu and Kashmir, India Lankreshipora (India)
- Coordinates: 34.3977°N 74.6390°E
- Country: India
- Union Territory: Jammu and Kashmir
- District: Bandipora

Languages
  - Official: Kashmiri, Urdu, Hindi, Dogri, English
- Time zone: UTC+5:30 (IST)
- PIN: 193502

Lankreshipora is a moderate size village located almost 2.5 km from main Bandipora town in the Indian union territory of Jammu and Kashmir. It is an industrial area situated on the banks of Wular Lake and a canal called Mudhmati Nala. Almost forty percent of the population is directly or indirectly associated with local band saw industries. Lankreshipora is known to supply raw material like wooden boxes for fruit packaging mostly to South Kashmir districts like Anantnag, Kulgam, Pulwama. Most people are dependent on fishing, carpet weaving and other handicrafts. Lankreshipora has been ignored by the local politicians from decades due to which it is one of the most underdeveloped villages in the whole district. The literacy rate is almost below 20 percent, however, the new generation is showing promise both in education and sports. Lack of education, sanitary and medical facilities are evident.

The village got its name from Zain-Lank, a small island in the centre of Wular Lake built by the famous Kashmiri saint Zain-ul-Abedin. The village is divided into several mohallas like Khan Mohalla, Reshi Mohalla, Khar colony, Pomposh Colony, Bani Mahal, Heri Mahal etc. There is only one middle school in the whole village with a very low teacher to student ratio, lacking all the basic facilities and is currently in a very dilapidated condition. Being situated at the banks of Wular, small spells of rain bring devastating floods and submerge the whole village. People generally are poor and middle-class but are known for their courage and hospitality.
