= Anayatpora =

Village in Jammu and Kashmir, India

Anayatpora Anayatpur
- Village
- Country: India
- Union Territory: Jammu and Kashmir
- District: Bandipora

Languages
  - Official: Kashmiri, Urdu, Hindi, Dogri, English
- Time zone: UTC+5:30 (IST)
- Vehicle registration: JK

Anayatpora, also known as Anayatpur or Anayat Pora, is a village located in Bandipora Tehsil of Bandipora district, Jammu and Kashmir. There are 338 families residing in the village, of which 1085 are males while 1042 are females as per Population Census 2011.
