= Badugam =

- Hill station
- Location in Jammu and Kashmir, India Badugam (India)
- Coordinates: 34.58°N 75.04°E
- Country: India
- Union territory: Jammu and Kashmir
- District: Bandipora
- Tehsil: Gurez

Government
  - Type: Panchayati raj
  - Body: Gram panchayat

Population (2011)
  - Total: 1,813

Languages
  - Official: Kashmiri, Urdu, Hindi, Dogri, English
  - Local: Shina
- Time zone: UTC+5:30 (IST)
- PIN: 193503

Badugam is a medium-sized village located in Tulail Tehsil of Bandipore district in the Indian administered union territory of Jammu and Kashmir. It is located 111 kilometres (69 mi) from Bandipora.

== Demographics ==
According to the 2011 census of India, Badugam has 250 households. The literacy rate of Badugam village was 56.04% compared to 67.16% of Jammu and Kashmir. In Badugam Male literacy stands at 72.19% while the female literacy rate was 36.22%.

Demographics (2011 Census)
	Total	Male	Female
Population	1813	990	823
Children aged below 6 years	423	224	199
Scheduled caste	0	0	0
Scheduled tribe	1808	987	821
Literacy	56.04%	72.19%	36.22%
Workers (all)	356	317	39
Main workers (total)	75	–	–
Marginal workers (total)	281	247	34
Non-workers	1097	476	621

== See also ==
- Gurez
- Tulail Valley
- Bandipora district
- Jammu and Kashmir
