= Gurez Assembly constituency =

Constituency of the Jammu and Kashmir legislative assembly in India

Coordinates: 34.636°N 74.774°E

Gurez
- Constituency No. 17 for the Jammu and Kashmir Legislative Assembly

Constituency details
- Country: India
- State: Jammu and Kashmir
- District: Bandipora
- Lok Sabha constituency: Baramulla
- Established: 1996
- Reservation: ST

Member of Legislative Assembly
- Incumbent Nazir Ahmad Khan
- Party: Jammu and Kashmir National Conference
- Elected year: 2024

Gurez Assembly constituency is one of the 90 constituencies in the Jammu and Kashmir Legislative Assembly of Jammu and Kashmir a north state of India. Gurez is also part of Baramulla Lok Sabha constituency.

== Members of Legislative Assembly ==
Year	Member	Party
1996	Fakir Mohammad Khan	Independent politician
2002	Nazir Ahmad Khan	Jammu & Kashmir National Conference
2008	Nazir Ahmad Khan	Jammu & Kashmir National Conference
2014	Nazir Ahmad Khan	Jammu & Kashmir National Conference
2024	Nazir Ahmad Khan	Jammu & Kashmir National Conference

== Election results ==
=== Assembly Election 2024 ===
2024 Jammu and Kashmir Legislative Assembly election : Gurez
Party	Candidate	Votes	%	±%
JKNC	Nazir Ahmad Khan	8,378	46.64%	▼2.49
BJP	Faqir Mohammed Khan	7,246	40.34%	New
DPAP	Nisar Ahmad Lone	1,966	10.95%	New
NOTA	None of the Above	150	0.84%	▲0.36
Independent	Ghulam Rasool	113	0.63%	New
JKPC	Mohammad Hamza Lone	109	0.61%	New
Margin of victory		1,132	6.30%	▲5.28
Turnout		17,962	81.16%	▲2.85
Registered electors		22,131		▲25.57
JKNC hold		Swing	▼1.64	

=== Assembly Election 2014 ===
2014 Jammu and Kashmir Legislative Assembly election : Gurez
Party	Candidate	Votes	%	±%
JKNC	Nazir Ahmad Khan	6,664	48.29%	▼2.78
INC	Faqir Mohammed Khan	6,523	47.26%	▲2.63
JKPDP	Mohammed Ismail Lone	448	3.25%	▲1.75
Independent	Ghulam Rasool Bhat	100	0.72%	New
NOTA	None of the Above	66	0.48%	New
Margin of victory		141	1.02%	▼5.40
Turnout		13,801	78.31%	▲4.29
Registered electors		17,624		▲14.52
JKNC hold		Swing	▼2.78	

=== Assembly Election 2008 ===
2008 Jammu and Kashmir Legislative Assembly election : Gurez
Party	Candidate	Votes	%	±%
JKNC	Nazir Ahmad Khan	5,817	51.06%	▼2.39
INC	Faqeer Ahmad Khan	5,085	44.64%	▲43.43
JKPDP	Nazir Ahmad Bhat	170	1.49%	New
AIFB	Mohammed Iqbal Lone	132	1.16%	New
BSP	Riyaz Ahmed Wani	114	1.00%	New
Jammu & Kashmir Democratic Party Nationalist	Abdul Aziz Wani	74	0.65%	New
Margin of victory		732	6.43%	▼5.13
Turnout		11,392	74.02%	▼2.48
Registered electors		15,390		▲8.84
JKNC hold		Swing	▼2.39	

=== Assembly Election 2002 ===
2002 Jammu and Kashmir Legislative Assembly election : Gurez
Party	Candidate	Votes	%	±%
JKNC	Nazir Ahmad Khan	5,782	53.45%	▲34.35
Independent	Faqir Mohammed Khan	4,532	41.90%	New
Independent	Mohammed Yasin Lone	210	1.94%	New
Independent	Ghulam Nabi	163	1.51%	New
INC	Hamidullah Mir	130	1.20%	▼16.13
Margin of victory		1,250	11.56%	▲0.94
Turnout		10,817	76.50%	▲2.58
Registered electors		14,140		▲42.83
JKNC gain from Independent		Swing	▲23.73	

=== Assembly Election 1996 ===
1996 Jammu and Kashmir Legislative Assembly election : Gurez
Party	Candidate	Votes	%	±%
Independent	Faqir Mohammed Khan	2,175	29.72%	New
JKNC	Mohammed Anwar	1,398	19.10%	New
JD	Nazir Ahmad Khan	1,340	18.31%	New
INC	Hamidulla Mir	1,268	17.33%	New
JKAL	Mohammed Anwar Sheikh	548	7.49%	New
Independent	Habibullah Mir	415	5.67%	New
JKNPP	Shabir Ahmad Khan	174	2.38%	New
Margin of victory		777	10.62%	
Turnout		7,318	76.14%	
Registered electors		9,900		
Independent win (new seat)				

== See also ==
- Gurez
- Baramulla district
- List of constituencies of Jammu and Kashmir Legislative Assembly
