= Kalusa =

Kalusa may refer to:

- Kalusa, India
- Kalusa, Iran
