= Neelum River =

River in India and Pakistan

Neelum River/Kishanganga River
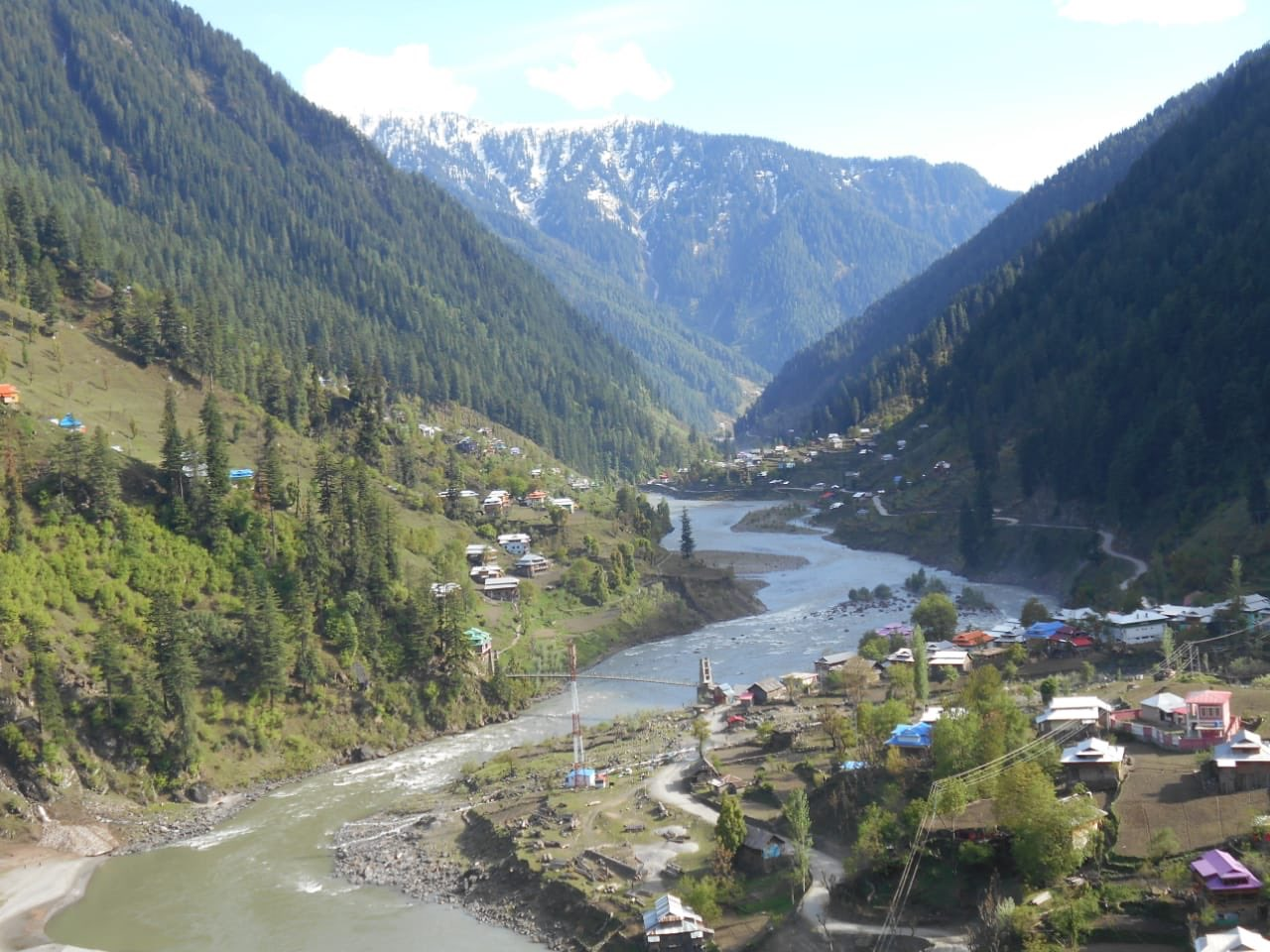
- Neelum River/Kishanganga River passing by Dosut, Neelum Valley /Kishanganga Valley
- Native name: نیلم آرٕ / کشنگنگہ آرٕ (Kashmiri); دریائے نیلم/دریائے کِشن گنگا (Urdu); किशनगंगा नदी/नीलम नदी (Hindi)

Location
- Region: Kashmir

Physical characteristics
- Source: 34.389629°N 75.121806°E
  - location: Krishansar Lake near Sonamarg, Ganderbal District, Indian-administered Kashmir
  - elevation: 3,710 m (12,170 ft)
- Mouth: 34.354869°N 73.468537°E
  - location: Jhelum River at Muzaffarabad, Pakistani-administered Kashmir
  - elevation: 750 m (2,460 ft)
- Length: 245 km (152 mi)
- Discharge
  - location: Muzzafarabad
  - average: 465 m^{3}/s (16,400 cu ft/s)

Basin features
- Progression: Jhelum River
- River system: Indus River

The Neelum River, also known as Kishanganga River, is a river in the Kashmir region in the Indian subcontinent. It originates in the Ganderbal district of Indian-administered Kashmir, flows through the Neelam Valley into Pakistani-administered Kashmir, where parts of its course fall along the Line of Control, before merging with the Jhelum River near the city of Muzaffarabad.

== Name of the river ==
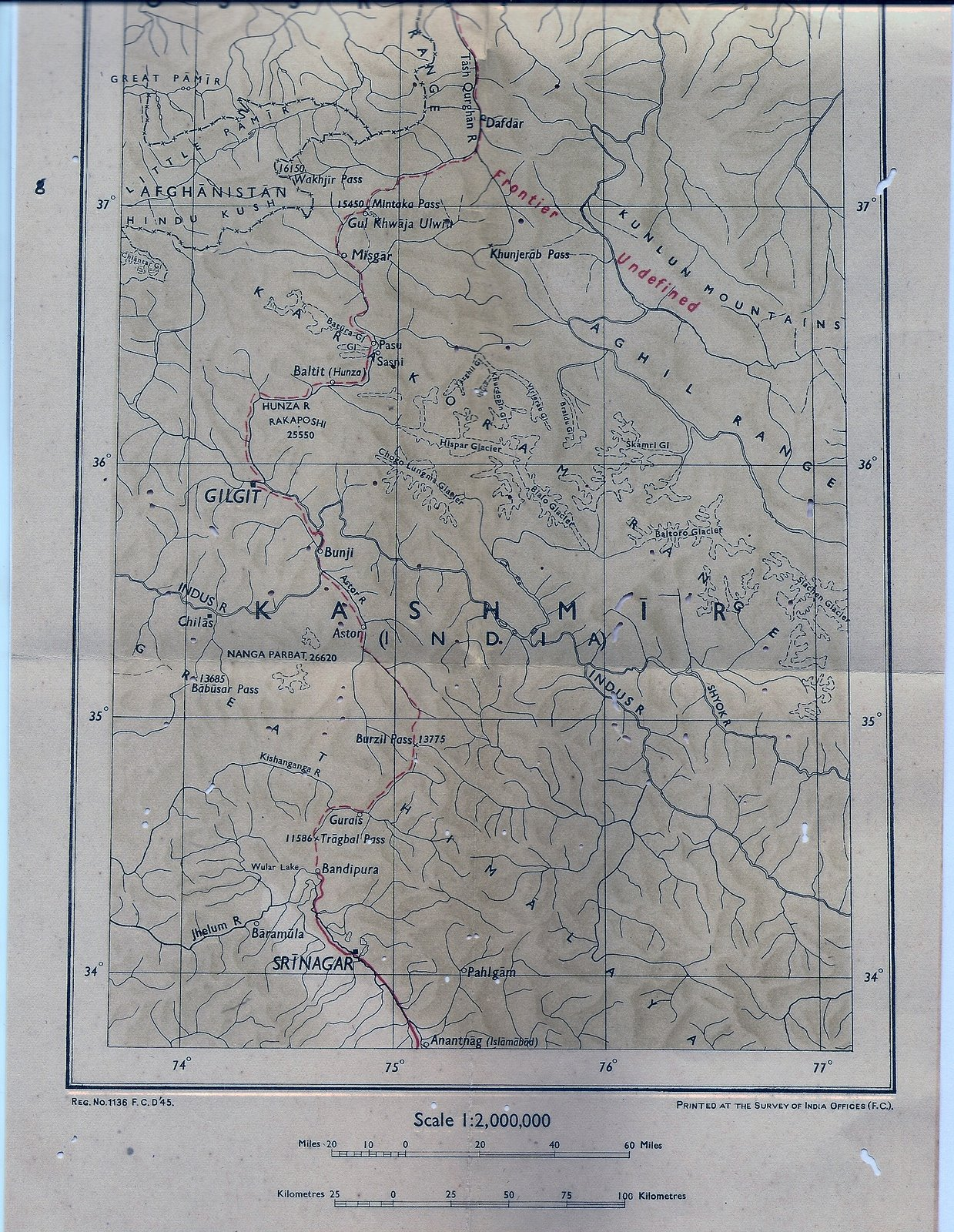
Colonial era map of the Princely State of Jammu and Kashmir by the Survey of India depicting the Kishanganga River.

The river has traditionally been known as the Kishanganga River (Hindi: किशनगंगा नदी, Urdu: دریائے کِشن گنگا) and is still known as such in India; after the partition of India in 1947, the river was renamed the Neelum River (Urdu: دریائے نیلم, Hindi: नीलम नदी) in Pakistan in 1956.

== Basin ==
Shardadesh is a name for the drainage basin of the Kishanganga River.

=== Course ===
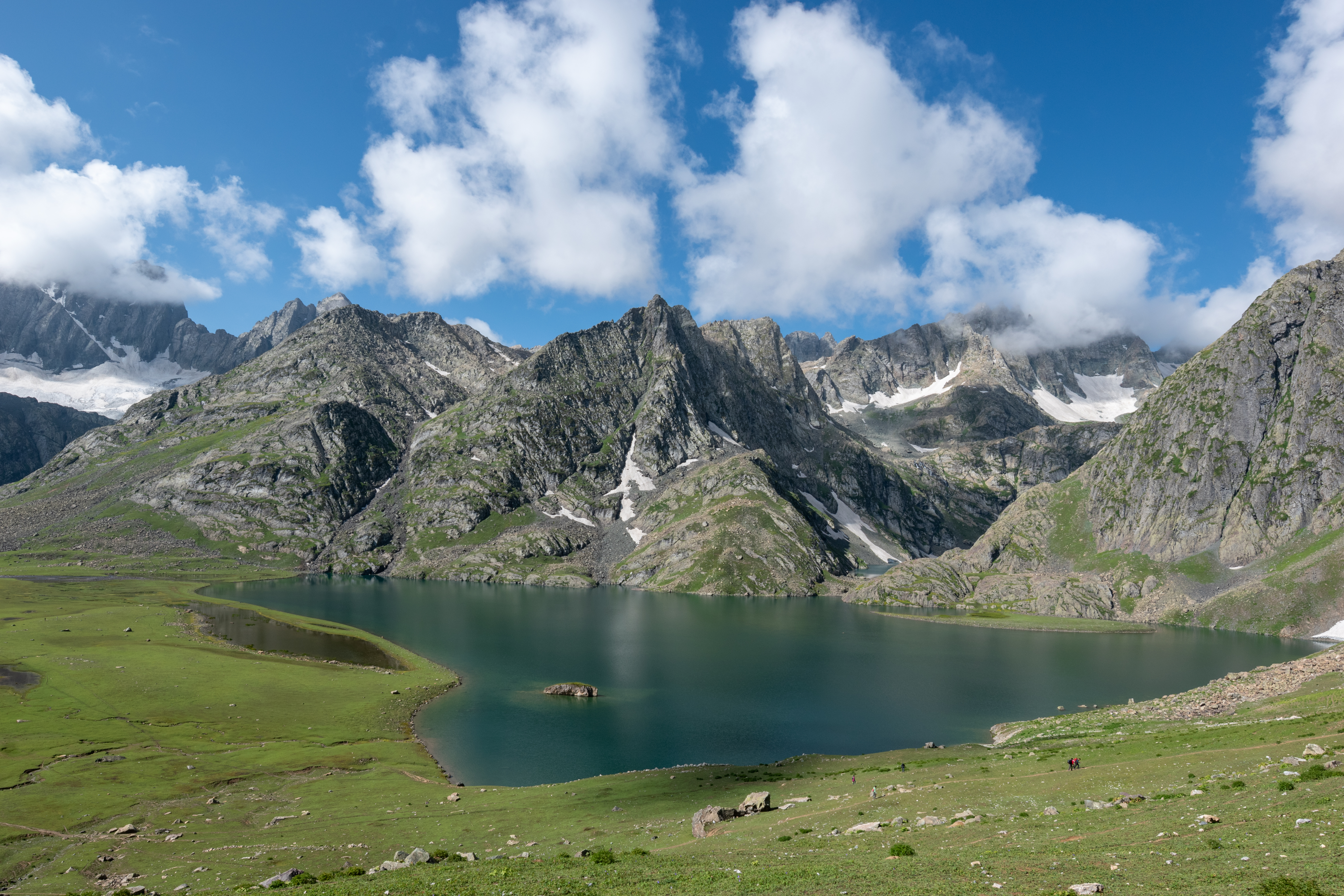
The glacial Krishansar Lake, the source of the Kishanganga river, in the Himalayas to the north of the tourist resort town of Sonamarg

The Kishanganga River originates from Krishansar lake in the vicinity of Sonamarg, an area of Ganderbal district in the Indian-administered union territory of Jammu and Kashmir, and runs northwards to Badoab village in Tulail Valley where it meets a tributary from the Dras side. It then runs westwards, parallel to the Line of Control. It is fed by many glacial tributary streams on its way. It enters the Pakistani-administered territory of Azad Kashmir in the Gurez sector of the Line of Control. Then it runs west again parallel to the Line of Control, passing by Sharada. After Sharda, it bends to a southwesterly direction and runs along the Line of Control near Tithwal. Then it bends northwest again, making a wide arc to join the Jhelum River in Muzaffarabad. Recently, the Go Gurez campaign has been launched to make people aware of the area.

=== Valleys ===
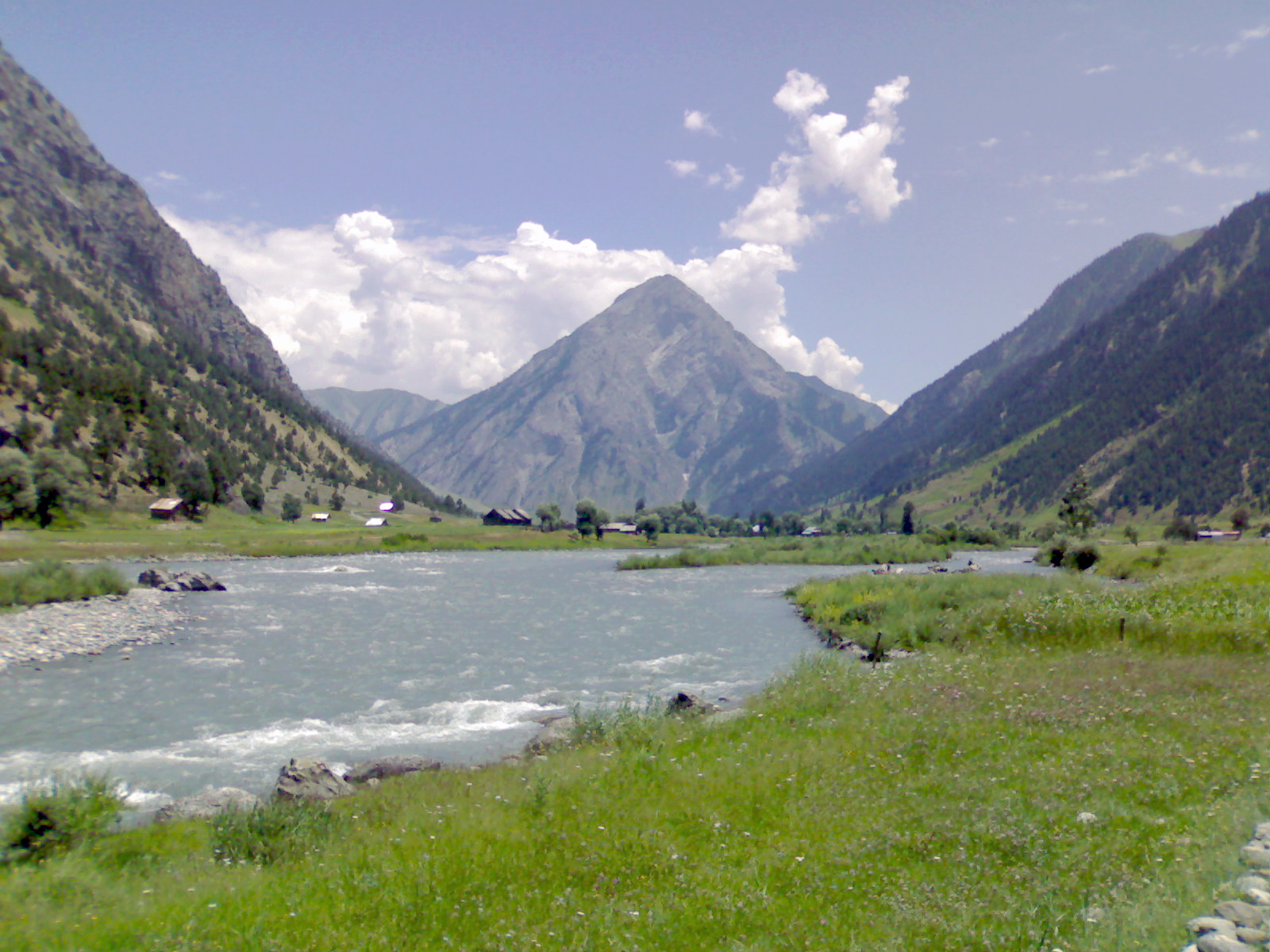
Kishanganga River flows through the Gurez valley, with the pyramid-shaped Habba Khatoon mountain in the background.

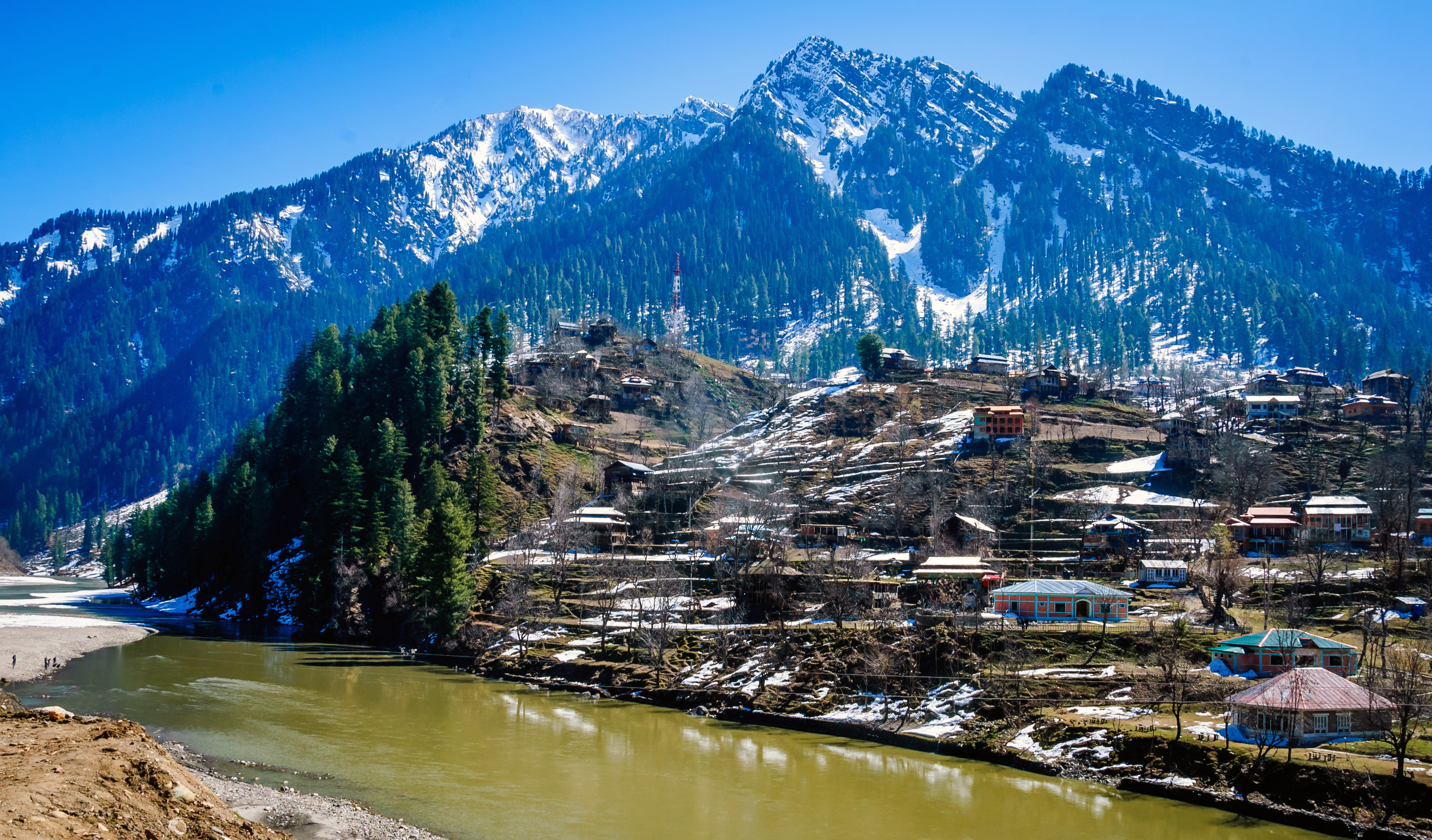
Neelum Valley

The Kishanganga River is 245 kilometres long. It covers 50 kilometers in the Indian-administered Kashmir, where it flows through the Tulail Valley and then Gurez Valley. It covers the remaining 195 kilometres in Pakistan-administered Kashmir and flows through the Neelam Valley.

The Neelum Valley is a Himalayan gorge in the Kashmir region, along which the Neelum River flows. This green and fertile valley is 250km in length and stretches its way from Muzaffarabad to Athmuqam and beyond to Taobutt. It is one of the most attractive tourist places, like Swat and Chitral, but due to poor road infrastructure, it remains largely inaccessible to the outside world. This area was badly affected by the 2005 earthquake and was cut off from the outside world as the roads and paths were filled with rubble. Now construction of an international standard road is in progress. There are 2 entrances for Neelum valley, one Neelum Road by Muzaffarabad and the other by Kaghan, the Jalkhad Road. Generally, Neelum valley starts just after Muzaffarabad, but in the political division, the area from Muzaffarabad to Chelhana is named Kotla valley. District Neelum starts from Chelhana and goes up to Taobutt.

== Ecology Revival ==
=== Types of fish species ===
There are different kinds of fish found in abundance in the Neelum River. As the river almost entirely runs across the Line of Control, being one of the main causes for Kashmir conflict there is a sense of uncertainty among the inhabitants, many of them have emigrated to safer places, which has left the river banks scarcely populous and kept the river in perfect conditions for growth of fish. The most well-known fish species found in Neelum River are:

- Brown trout (Salmo trutta)
- Rainbow trout (Oncorhynchus mykiss)
- Snow trout (Schizothorax plagiostomus)
- Shuddgurn
- Anyour

=== Dams ===
==== Kishanganga dam in India ====
In the Indian union territory of Jammu and Kashmir, the construction work on the 330 MW Kishanganga Hydroelectric Plant project has started, after being defunct for eighteen years. Recently, the hydropower project was awarded to Hindustan Construction Company (HCC) with a timeline of seven years. The 330 MW Kishanganga hydro-electric power project involves damming of the Kishanganga River, and the proposed 37 metre reservoir will submerge some parts of the Gurez valley. The water of Kishen Ganga River will be diverted through a 24-kilometre tunnel dug through the mountains to Bandipore, where it will join the Wular Lake and then the Jhelum River.

==== Neelum–Jhelum dam in Pakistan ====
Similarly, Pakistan is constructing the 969 MW Neelum–Jhelum Hydropower Plant; the country has placed the project in the hands of a Chinese consortium. Pakistan claims that the Indian dam project will violate the Indus Waters Treaty and has pursued formal arbitration proceedings against India over the matter.

== Religious significance ==
Krishansar Lake and Sharada Peeth are important religious sites for Hindus, who undertake the annual pilgrimage to these sites along the Kishanganga River. In ancient times, it was among the prominent centres of learning in the subcontinent, in part with Nalanda and Taxila. Sharada script, the native script for the Kashmiri language, is named in honor of the main deity of Sharada Peeth. Sharada Peeth is one of the most venerated sites for the Kashmiri Pandits. The Sharada Peeth temple was damaged in the 2005 Kashmir earthquake. The Supreme Court of Pakistan has since ordered the Government to conserve the Sharada Peeth temple and to identify and restore temples and gurudwaras. The "Save Sharada Committee" of concerned Hindus has been demanding the opening of a special corridor from India to Sharada Peeth in Pakistan-administered Kashmir for the visits of Hindu pilgrims from India.

== See also ==
- Karen Village
