= Razdan Pass =

Mountain pass in Jammu and Kashmir

- Location within Jammu and Kashmir Location within India
- Elevation: 3,556 m (11,667 ft)

Third Approach
- Location: Jammu and Kashmir, India
- Range: Himalayas, Gratawat
- Coordinates: 34.54123954621257°N 74.63673520185993°E

Razdan Pass, (sometimes Rajdhan Pass) is a 3,556 m (11,667 ft) high mountain pass in the Himalayas of Jammu and Kashmir, India. It connects the Gurez Valley in the north to the Kashmir Valley in the south, and is located in the Bandipora district. The pass remains closed for vehicular movement for over 3-4 months during winter due to heavy snowfall.

The pass is the only route connecting Gurez with the rest of the world. The pass connects dozens of remote and far-flung areas, including those near the Line of Control with the district headquarter of Bandipora, and is of strategic importance. The Harmukh mountain, the highest peak in the surrounding area, is also visible from here.

== Razdan Pass Tunnel ==
Border Road Organisation (BRO) is planning to build Razdan Pass Tunnel project in Jammu and Kashmir, India. The project involves the construction of an 18km tunnel between Gurez and Bandipore. The project includes the construction of a road and related facilities, and the installation of ventilation system, fire protection system, safety management system and free-flow electronic tolling system.

In 2009, a proposal for construction of tunnel across the Razdan pass on Bandipora-Gurez road was submitted by Project BEACON to Border Roads Organisation (BRO).

In 2011, Geodata Engineering was appointed as the design engineering consultant to undertake feasibility studies, on-site investigation and advanced preliminary design on the project. Mount Geo Technical Services Pvt. Ltd. has been appointed as the consulting engineer.

In 2015, feasibility studies, on-site investigation and advanced preliminary design on the project completed.

In 2016, detail project report (DPR) was prepared and submitted to the Central Government for its approvals. The project was delayed for years due to financial issues.

In April 2018, the project received preliminary approvals from the central government and currently, necessary formalities are under process to go ahead with the project development.
