= HKM =

HKM may refer to:

- Hassan Khoyihami Memorial College, Bandipora, Jammu and Kashmir, India
- Human Killing Machine, a fighting video game released in 1989
- Huwag Kang Mangamba, 2021 Philippine drama series
- Hykeham railway station, in England
