= Nathpora =

Nathpora Nathpur
- Village
- Location in Jammu and Kashmir, India Nathpora (India)
- Coordinates: 34.41°N 74.62°E
- Country: India
- Union Territory: Jammu and Kashmir
- District: Bandipora

Languages
  - Official: Kashmiri, Urdu, Hindi, Dogri, English
- Time zone: UTC+5:30 (IST)
- PIN: 193502

Nathpora, also known as Nathpur, is a village in Bandipora district of the Indian union territory of Jammu and Kashmir.
