= Faisal Ali Dar =

Padma Awardee

Personal information
- Nickname: Master Faisal
- Born: Bandipora, Jammu and Kashmir India
- Occupation: National Kickboxing Coach

Sport
- Country: India
- Sport: Martial arts

Faisal Ali Dar is an Indian martial arts coach, and first person to receive the Padma Shri Award in sports from the union territory of Jammu and Kashmir. He was conferred with the national award for his contributions in promoting sports through martial arts and his works for keeping the youth away from drugs.

Faisal belongs to the Bandipora District.
