= Kalusa, India =

Kalusa Kaloosa
- Town
- Location in Jammu and Kashmir, India Kalusa (India)
- Coordinates: 34.42°N 74.62°E
- Country: India
- Union Territory: Jammu and Kashmir
- District: Bandipora

Languages
  - Official: Kashmiri, Urdu, Hindi, Dogri, English
- Time zone: UTC+5:30 (IST)
- PIN: 193502
- Vehicle registration: JK

Kalusa, Kaloosa or Kaloos is a village in the Bandipore district of Jammu and Kashmir, India.

About 72 families of Kashmiri Pandits lived in this village immediately before the mass forced-exodus from the valley in the early 1990s. Presently as of January 2009, only about 4 Kashmiri Pandit families live there. The rest of the population are Kashmiri Muslims.

A Sharda Mandir (Temple), is believed to be a stop of the Maa Sharda, whose original temple is in Pakistani-administered Kashmir.

There are two big mosques. Jamia Kabeer at main chowk and Jamia Qadeem near Jan's ex.zaildar of the village

Some people believe that a hermit named "Kalsha" used to offer prayers in this village in ancient times and the village was thus named after him. But with the passage of time, the name deformed first from "Kalsha" to "Kalusha" and then to "Kalusa" which is the name of the village now. It is divided into different Mohallas like Khan mohalla'Shah mohalla'Akhoon mohalla'Batt mohalla'Grees mohalla'Khar mohalla'Ganaie mohalla'Rather mohalla etc.
