= Aloosa =

Olus Aaloosa
- Tehsil
- Aloosa
- Location in Jammu and Kashmir, India Olus (India)
- Coordinates: 34.42°N 74.53°E
- Country: India
- Union Territory: Jammu and Kashmir
- District: Bandipora

Population (2011)
  - Total: 11,044

Languages
  - Official: Kashmiri, Urdu, Hindi, Dogri, English
- Time zone: UTC+5:30 (IST)
- PIN: 193505
- Vehicle registration: JK

Aloosa or Aaloosa, also known as Olus is a town located in Bandipora district, Jammu and Kashmir, India.
