= 2017 Gurez sector avalanche =

Gurez avalanche
- Date: 25 January 2017
- Location: Jammu and Kashmir, India; 34°36′18″N 74°57′42″E
- Deaths: 24 (20 soldiers, 4 civilians), (Some people are still missing)

The Gurez Avalanche Accident was a series of four avalanches that claimed the lives of 24 persons, including 20 soldiers and four civilians in Jammu and Kashmir on the evening of 25 January 2017.

== Avalanche ==
Kashmir valley witnessed multiple heavy snowfall spells in January 2017 that triggered an avalanche, killing 24 people, including 20 Indian Army Personnel, whose camp was struck by the avalanche. An analysis of the heavy snowfall events that occurred at the majority of districts in Kashmir during January 2017 was analysed by Rafiq and Mishra using station data from the India Meteorological Department (IMD). Results show that there were three episodes of intense snowfall over different parts of Kashmir. Maximum daily accumulated snowfall measurements of about 11.5 and 9.2 cm were recorded at Pahalgam and Banihall stations, respectively, on 26 January 2017. Gulmarg also recorded a maximum daily accumulated snowfall of 8.8 cm on 25 January 2017. The snowfall anomaly data show that Gulmarg, Srinagar, Kupwara, Banihall, Quazigund and Pahalgam witnessed the highest snowfall of recent decades. Gulmarg and Pahalgam recorded cumulative snowfall measurements of about 38.4 and 30 cm, respectively, during January. Data from the region reveal that the accumulated snow from three episodes of intense snowfall during 6–8, 15–17 and 25–27 January 2017 resulted in an avalanche over Kashmir.

There was heavy snowfall before the accident, there had been multiple avalanches in Jammu and Kashmir. The Chandigarh based Snow and Avalanche Study Establishment warned of more avalanches in Jammu and Kashmir and Himachal Pradesh before the accident took place.

The first avalanche hit Gurez on 25 of January morning, in which a family of four civilians died. The second took place around the same time in Sonmarg, chiefly a tourist area, where an army camp was located. While seven soldiers were rescued later Indian Army Braveheart Major Amit Sagar, who had been buried in snow was martyred.

In the evening, two avalanches again hit the Gurez Valley roughly 150 km from Sonmarg in quick succession. One affected an army camp located there, the other hit a group of soldiers who had been out on patrol. The bodies of 10 soldiers have been recovered from the area, the army said. It is not yet known how many soldiers are missing.

On 28 January 4 more bodies of soldiers were found taking the death toll to 15 soldiers.
