= Government Degree College, Bandipora =

College in Jammu and Kashmir, India

Hassan Khoyihami Memorial Govt. Degree College, Bandipora
- حسن کھئوہامی میموریئل ڈگری کالج بانڈی پورہ
- Motto: نورُعلیٰ نورِ
- Motto in English: Light upon Light
- Type: Undergraduate college
- Established: 2005 (21 years ago)
- Academic affiliations: University of Kashmir
- Principal: Prof. (Dr) Suresh Kumar Dogra
- Location: Patushay, Jammu and Kashmir, 193502, India; 34°25′27″N 74°35′26″E
- Campus: 118 Kanals (app); Rural
- Language: Urdu & English
- Website: gdcbandipora.edu.in

Government Degree College Patushay Bandipora (Urdu;گورنمنٹ ڈگری کالج بانڈی پُورہ) also known as HKM (Hassan Khoyihami Memorial College), GDC Bandipora, is University Grants Commission autonomous co-educational degree college affiliated with the University of Kashmir situated in Bandipora in the Indian union territory of Jammu and Kashmir.The college is affiliated with University of Kashmir, Hazratbal Srinagar and is recognised by University Grants Commission of India under articles 2(f) and 12(b) of UGC Act, 1956. The college is accredited with NAAC Grade - B.

== Location ==
The college is located at Patushay in district headquarter, Bandipora in the Indian union territory of Jammu and Kashmir. It is located in North-Kashmir and situated at a distance of 57 km from Srinagar on the eastern bank of Wular Lake.

== Establishment ==
Government of Jammu and Kashmir established the college in the year 2005 during the Chief-Ministership of Mufti Mohammad Sayeed. The college is one of the first institution of higher education in district Bandipora. The main aim of establishment of college was to open the doors of higher education to students belonging to far-flung hilly areas of district Bandipora.

=== About ===
Government Degree College, Bandipora is also known as HKM (for the 'Hassan Khoyihami Memorial College') GDC Bandipora. It is named after Hassan Khoyihami, a native poet and historian of 19th century in Kashmir, who provided information on all aspects of human life, geography, flora, fauna and archaeological remains of Kashmir.

== Courses offered ==
The college offers bachelor courses in Arts, Science and Commerce streams.

=== Bachelor courses ===
- Bachelors in Arts
- Bachelors in Arts (with Computer)
- Bachelors in Science (Medical)
- Bachelors in Science (Non-Medical)
- Bachelors in Science (with Computer)
- Bachelors in Commerce (B.Com.)
