= Gurez =

Tehsil in Indian-administered Jammu and Kashmir

Gurez Guráai Gurais
- Tehsil
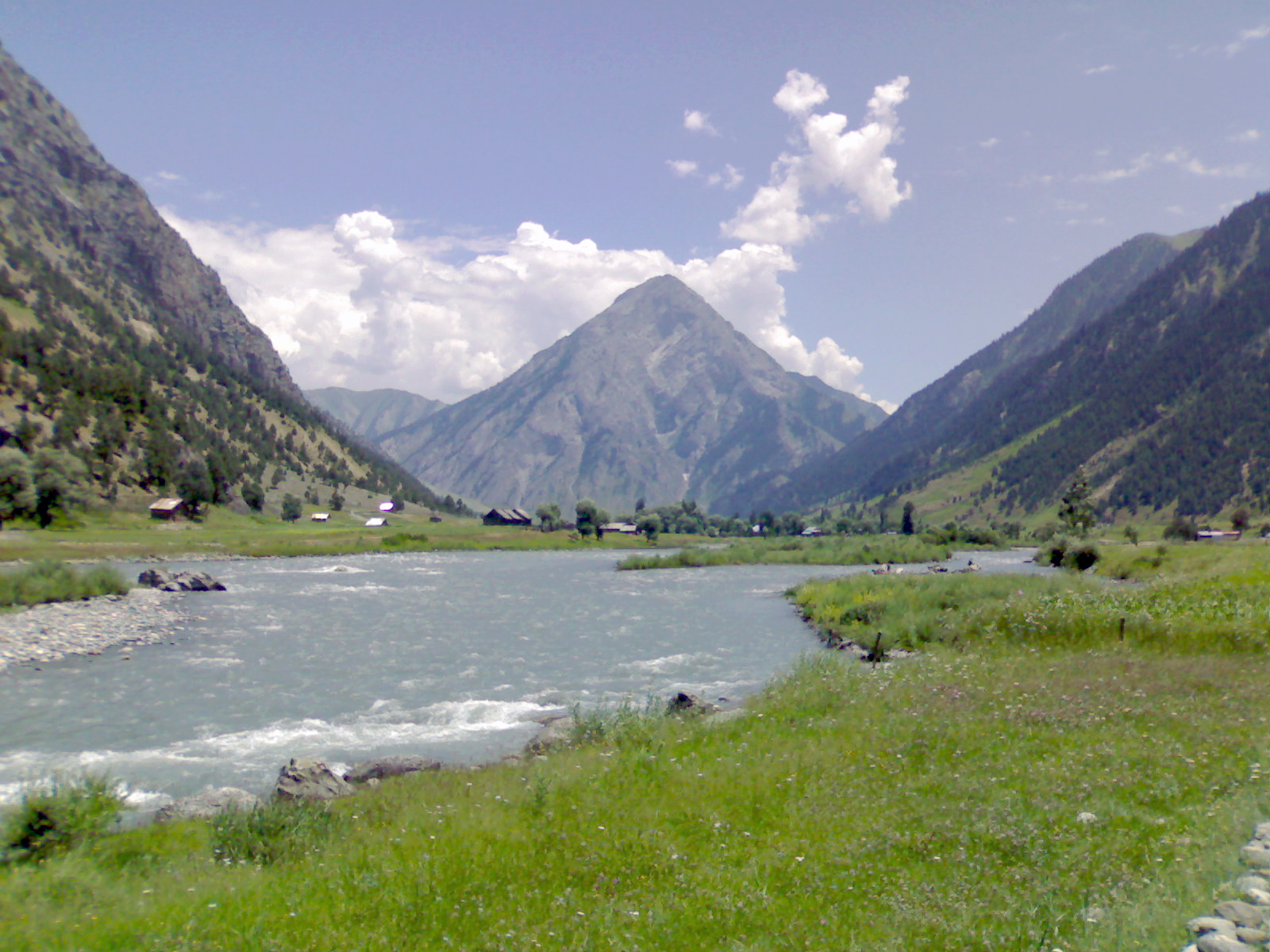
- View of Habba Khatoon in Gurez

- Location in Jammu and Kashmir Gurez (India)
- Coordinates: 34.6333°N 74.8333°E
- Country: India
- Union Territory: Jammu and Kashmir
- District: Bandipora

Government
  - Vidhan Sabha Constituency: Gurez
  - MLA: Nazir Ahmad Khan Gurezi
  - Sub-Divisional Magistrate: Dr. Mukhtar Ahmad Ahanger, JKAS
- Elevation: 2,580 m (8,460 ft)

Population (2011)
  - Total: 37,992

Demographics
  - Literacy: 59.17%
  - Sex ratio: 653 ♀/ 1000 ♂

Languages
  - Official: Kashmiri, Urdu, Hindi, Dogri, English
  - Spoken: Shina, Kashmiri
- Time zone: UTC+5:30 (IST)
- PIN: 193503
- Vehicle registration: JK-15
- Website: bandipore.nic.in

Gurez, or Gurais (Guráai in Shina language), is a tehsil in Bandipore District in Jammu and Kashmir in India. It contains most of the Gurez Valley, located in the high Himalayas to the north of the Kashmir Valley, separated from it by the great Himalayan range, and is situated about 86 kilometres (53 mi) from district headquarters Bandipore and 123 kilometres (76 mi) from Srinagar. A sub-valley of Gurez beyond Kamri came under Pakistani control after 1947, including Minimarg, and is today part of Astore District in Gilgit-Baltistan.

Gurez lies near the Line of Control, which separates it from the Astore and Neelum Districts of Pakistan-administered Kashmir. The Burzil Pass in Astore leads from it into Astore Valley. At about 2,400 metres (8,000 ft) above sea level, the valley is surrounded by snow-capped mountains. The fauna include the Himalayan brown bear and the snow leopard. The Neelum River flows through the valley. Due to heavy snowfall and closure of Razdan Pass in winter, Gurez remains cut off for six months of the year from rest of Indian-administered Jammu and Kashmir.

Dawar is the central township in the area. The population of the area is estimated to be about 40,000, and is scattered among fifteen villages. Majority of the inhabitants are ethnic Shins. They speak the Shina language and have the same dress styles and culture as their kinsmen in Pakistan-administered Gilgit-Baltistan.

== History ==
Historically, Gurez was part of ancient Dardistan, stretching between Sharada Peeth in the west, Minimarg in the north, Drass in the east, and Bagtore in the south. The valley falls along the ancient Silk Route, which connected the Kashmir Valley with Gilgit, before continuing further to Kashgar. Archaeological surveys in valleys north of Gurez have uncovered hundreds of carved inscriptions in Kharoshthi, Brahmi, and Tibetan.

The ancient capital of the Dards, Dawar, is located in the Gurez Valley. Other archaeological sites in the valley include Kanzalwan.

Franklin Delano Roosevelt visited before he was the US president. During the colonial period, Jawaharlal Nehru and his daughter Indira Gandhi visited the area in the 1940s.

== Geography ==
While describing the Kishenganga Valley (Gurez), Walter R. Lawrence writes in his book The Valley of Kashmir,

"Perhaps Pahalgam, the village of the shepherds that stands at the head of the Liddar valley with its healthy forest of pines, and Gurez, which lies at a distance of thirty-five miles from Bandipora, the port of the Wular Lake, will before long rival in popularity the other margs. Gurez is a lovely valley five miles in length lying at an elevation of about 8000 feet above the sea. The Kishenganga river flows through it, and on either side are mountains. The climate is dry and mild, excellent English vegetables can be grown, and the wild raspberries and currants are delicious."

"The valley is extremely picturesque, as the river comes dashing along through a rich meadow, partly covered with lindens, walnut and willow trees, while the mountains on either side present nothing but a succession of most abrupt precipices, and Alpine lodges, covered with fir trees."

=== Habba Khatoon ===
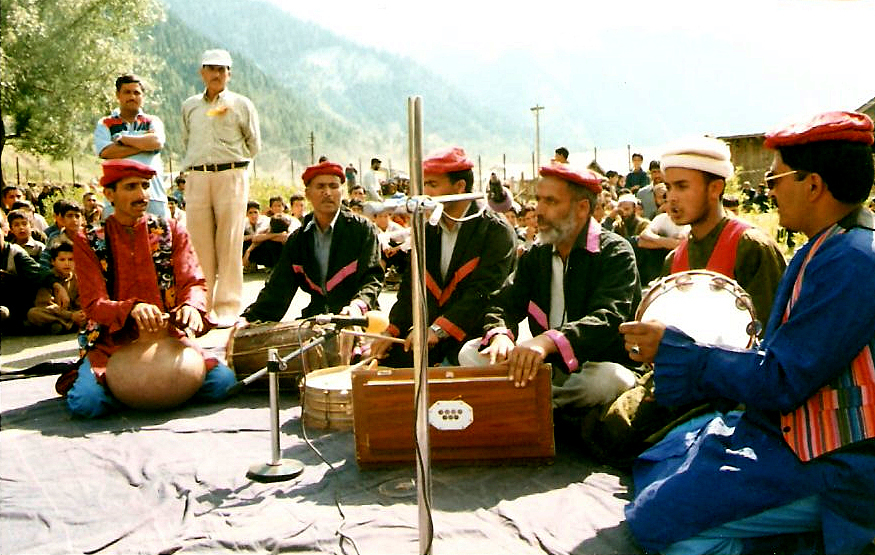
Fareed Kaloo, president of the Habba Khatoon club, presenting a cultural item in Gurez

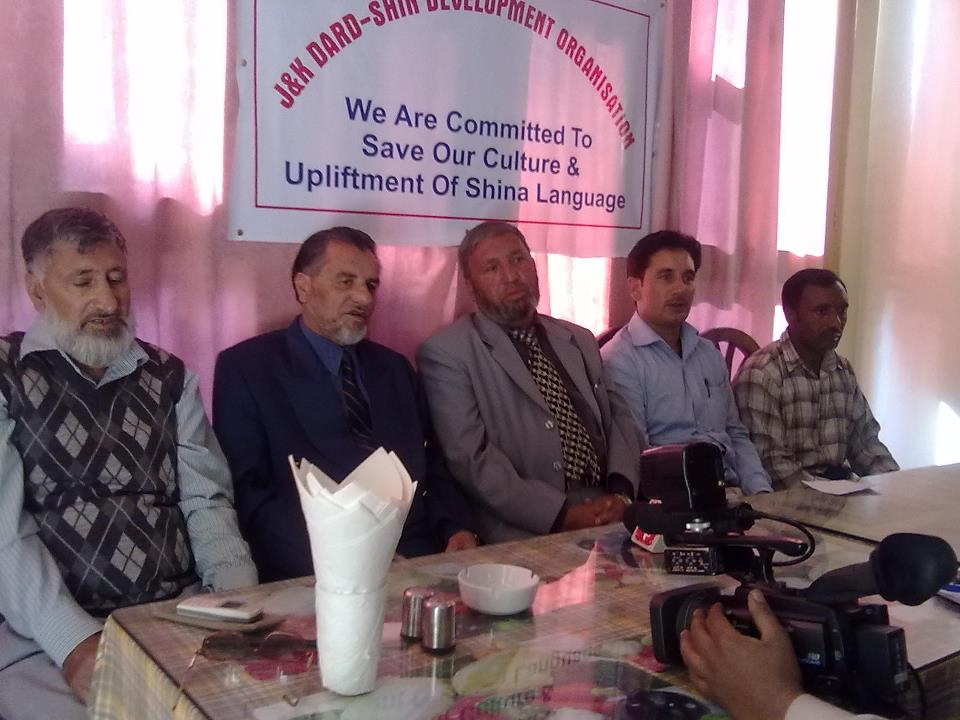
Hajji Abdul Aziz Samoon (middle) at a press conference in Srinagar

Gurez's most formidable peak is Habba Khatoon, around which legends abound and at one time, even a film starring Dimple Kapadia was planned. This pyramid shaped peak was named after the Kashmiri poet Habba Khatoon. She was a beautiful and intelligent woman from Saffron village Chandhara, and originally known as "Zoon" (which means Moon in English). She was the daughter of a peasant Abuddi Rather, who married her to an illiterate peasant boy named Habba. Zoon was ill-treated by her mother-in-law and husband, because she spent most of her time in poetry and singing. Dejected by her plight, she changed her name to Habba Khatoon.

The emperor of Kashmir, Yousuf Shah Chak, was enthralled by her beauty, intelligence and poetry. He arranged her divorce from Habba and married her. According to the story, Shah Chak was imprisoned by his rival King Akbar, Habba Khatoon used to wander near the peak that now bears her name to look for her lover. After her husband's death, she wandered the banks of river Jhelum in mourning. She died twenty years later by drowning into the Jhelum and now her tomb is at Athwajan. Habba Khatoon Drama club was founded in 1976 by the poet Late Hajji Abdul Aziz Samoon (Retired Police Officer; SSP). The club played a pivotal role in safeguarding the cultural ethos and traditions of the Dard-Shin tribe. Hajji Abdul Aziz Samoon(KPS) was also Chairman of Jammu and Kashmir Dard-Shina Development Organization (JKDSDO), a body representing Dard community in the state JKDSDO

== Economy ==
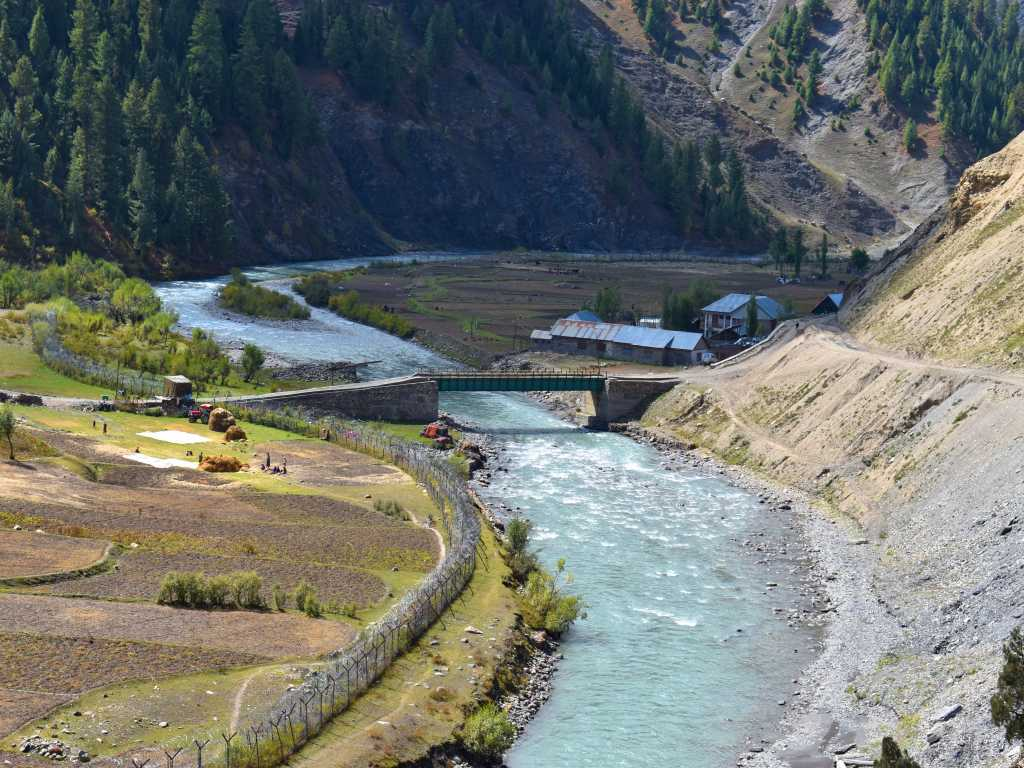
A river sight from Gurez-Tulail Valley

=== Energy ===
There is no central electricity in Gurez, although, as of 2009, a hydro-electric plant was constructed by the National Hydroelectric Power Corporation. It is unclear if any of the generated energy will be available to the valley itself. India had initially planned to construct a 100-metre-high dam on the Kishenganga, which would have flooded the majority of the Gurez Valley and forced nearly all of its residents to relocate. But due to resistance by the Dard Shin and by Pakistan Government, which is constructing a dam downstream, the dam's height was reduced to 37 metres. Set for completion in 2016, the dam now diverts water from the Kishenganga towards Wular Lake in Bandipora district via a 20 kilometre concrete tunnel, and generates 330 Mega Watts electricity for the Indian States. Although construction of the dam has temporarily bring work and money into the area, the Dard Shin have expressed concern that around 130 families were forced to leave their homes and to relocate in the different districts of Jammu and Kashmir, and more than 300 hectares (740 acres) of land in the valley is submerged.

Because of the lack of electricity, there is no significant industrial activity in the valley. The only electricity which is available comes from a few diesel generators which provide power to some parts of the area in summer for an hour at a time. The Indian government's relocation plans are unclear, and it has not yet committed to providing hydroelectricity to those who will remain in the valley.

=== Fishery ===
Kishenganga River, with a length of 150 kilometres (93 mi), supports world-class trout with an average weight of 11 kilograms (24 lb). As of 2006, there were plans to develop the fishery potential of the area, making it a resource for the surrounding region.

Fish in the river include:

- Brown trout (Salmo trutta fario)
- Rainbow trout (Salmo gairdneri)

== Demographics ==
Religion in Gurez Tehsil (2011)
1. Islam (84.0%)
2. Hinduism (14.2%)
3. Sikhism (1.16%)
4. Christianity (0.36%)
5. Buddhism (0.05%)
6. Not Stated (0.21%)

According to the 2011 census of India, Gurez Tehsil had a population of 37,992 people with 22,978 males and 15,014 females. The number of Scheduled Castes and Scheduled Tribes numbered 104 and 31,094 respectively. Most of the people in Gurez speak Kashmiri and Shina.

=== Language ===
According to the 2011 Census, Gurez has a linguistic landscape where Kashmiri is the most widely spoken language, with 17,865 speakers, representing about 47.06% of the population. Shina is spoken by 12,705 individuals, accounting for approximately 33.48%. Hindi has 4,938 speakers, making up approximately 13.00%. Additionally, various other languages are spoken in the region, contributing to the overall linguistic demographics of Gurez.

=== Religion ===
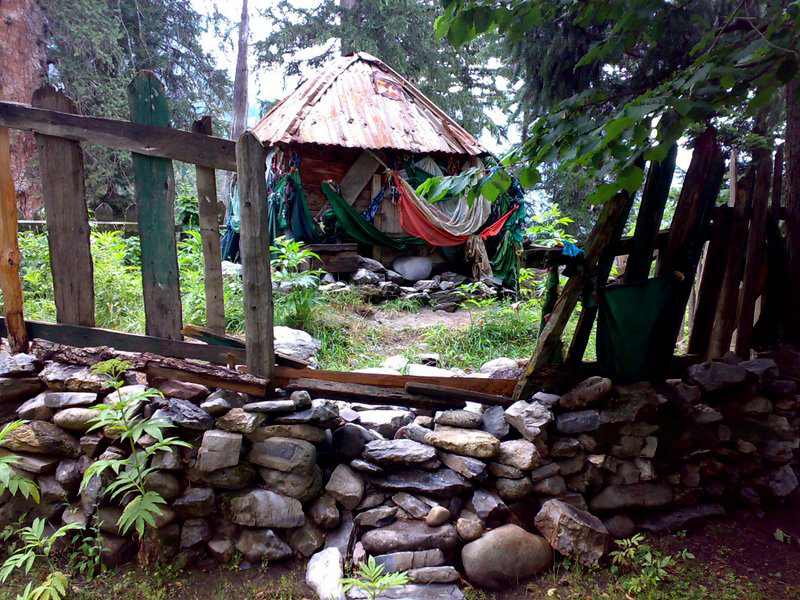
Shrine of Baba Razaaq in the lap of mountain in Dawar

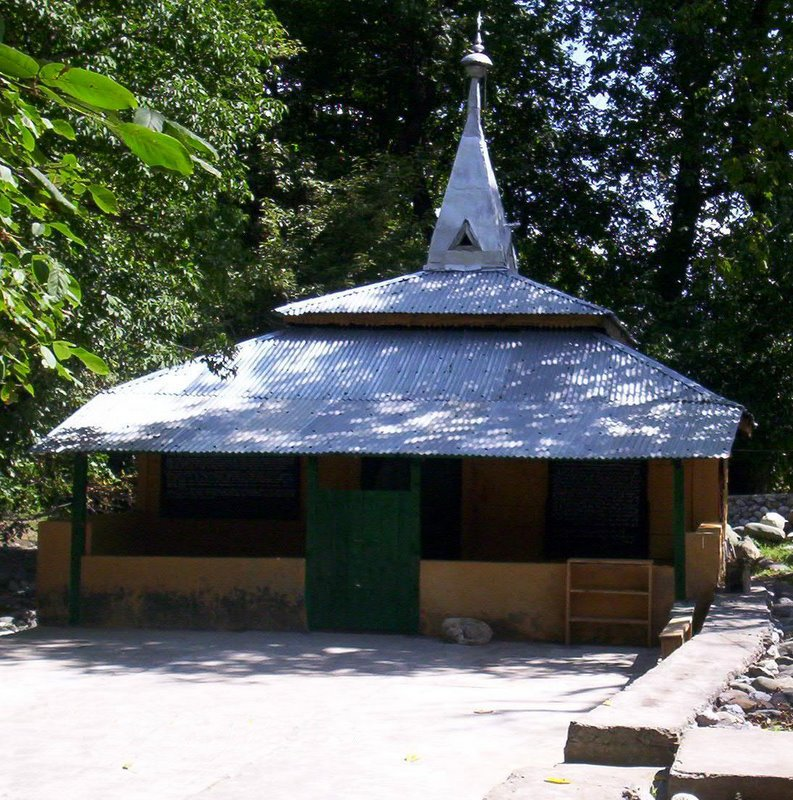
Shrine of Baba Darvaish in Fakirpora near Khandyal

Gurez is majority muslims. Before the arrival of Mir Sayyid Ali Hamadani, the region was predominantly Hindu. Hamadani visited the Kashmir valley three times, accompanied by about seven hundred preachers, known as "Sadaats". Of these seven hundred people, seven settled in Gurez and included Baba Abdur Razaq Shah and Baba Dervaish whose shrines are located near the hamlet of Fakirpora. The names of the other saints are unknown, although they also have shrines, located at Chorwan, Bagtore, Dangital Tulail across the Kishan Ganga River, and at Kamri across the border near Dood-Gagi village in Pakistan administered Jammu and Kashmir.

According to the 2011 Census, Islam is the predominant religion in Gurez, with 31,907 adherents, constituting approximately 84% of the total population of 37,992. Hinduism is the second-largest religion, with 5,411 followers, accounting for around 14.24% of the population. Sikhism is practiced by 439 individuals (1.15%), while Christianity has a smaller presence with 137 adherents, comprising 0.36% of the population.

=== Peer Baba ===
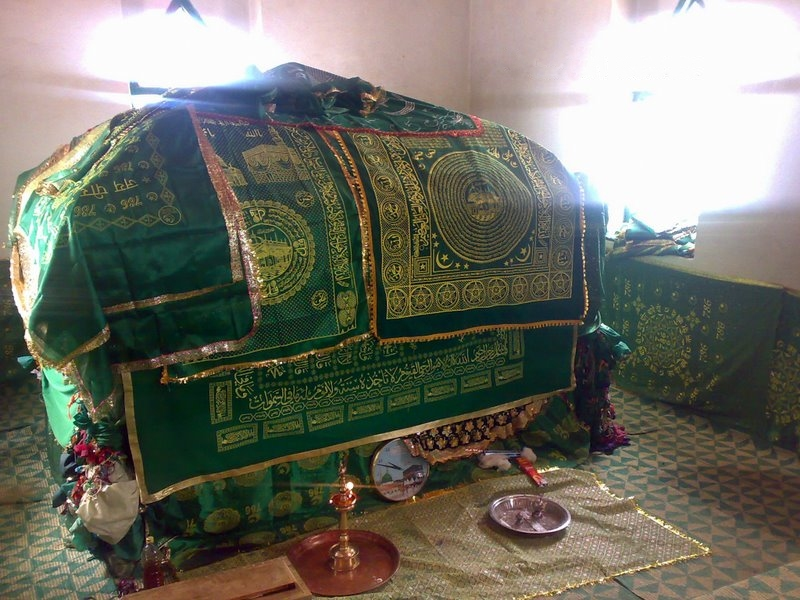
Grave of Peer Baba

The Peer Baba came from Multan (Pakistan) in 1933 and established himself in a cave at Durmat, north of Kanzalwan. He was about 35 years old, and his religion is unknown. He is said to have fasted for months without taking any food or water. On occasion, he came down to Kanzalwan and asked for food in Farsi with an Urdu accent. He never refused mutton offered by local Muslims. He was hard of hearing, spoke very little and was popularly known as "Nanga Baba". In Feb 1940, he came down from Durmat to Rajdhan during a heavy snowstorm and subsequently died. When the Dilawar Malik, one of the big landlords of Kashmir saw Peer Baba dead in a dream at the same spot, who was his devotee sent his men who tried to bring the Baba's body to Bandipur for burial, they were attacked by a large number of honeybees, and he was instead buried close to Razdaan Pass.

== Transportation ==
=== Air ===
There is a helipad in the tehsil headquarters Dawar. There is another helipad in Badoab, 43 kilometres from Dawar. The nearest airport is Sheikh ul-Alam International Airport in Srinagar, located 150 kilometres from Dawar. A helicopter service was started in the region by the state government in 2017. Using this service people can reach Gurez from the Sheikh ul-Alam International Airport in 20 minutes cutting down the travel time by a huge margin.

=== Rail ===
There is no railway connectivity to Gurez Valley. The nearest railway station is Sopore railway station located 115 kilometres from Dawar.

=== Road ===
The tehsil is connected to other places in Jammu and Kashmir and India by the Bandipora–Gurez Road. Road connectivity has been a major issue for the population due to their being heavy snowfall during the winter months. In 2015 the Border Roads Organisation had submitted a proposal to the Indian Central Government for the construction of an 18-km long tunnel that would ensure yearlong connectivity of the Gurez to the rest of the Kashmir Valley. However the project has not moved past the DPR stage.

The 130-kilometer road connecting the Gurez Valley to Mushkoh Valley in Kargil’s Drass Sector, connected by Kaobal Gali (4,166.9 metres, between Abdullum and Batokul), the highest pass in Gurez, is now open for off-roading tourists, offering a glimpse into the historic landscape of the Kargil War. These areas, once battlegrounds, hold significant importance in the Kargil conflict.

== See also ==
- Geography of Ladakh
  - Markoot, in Gurez valley
  - Dawar, in Gurez valley
  - Tulail Valley, immediate east of Gurez
- Tourism in Ladakh
  - Gulmarg
- Transport in Ladakh
- Incidences
  - 2017 Gurez sector avalanche
  - Operation Eraze, 1947 operation by the Indian Army during the Indo-Pakistani War of 1947 to recapture Gurez
