= Bandipore =

Town in Jammu and Kashmir, India

Bandipore Bandüpūr Bandipora
- Town
- Location in Jammu and Kashmir Bandipore (India)
- Coordinates: 34°25′23″N 74°38′10″E
- Country: India
- Union Territory: Jammu and Kashmir
- District: Bandipora

Area
  - Total: 13.40 km^{2} (5.17 sq mi)

Population (2011)
  - Total: 37,081
  - Density: 2,767/km^{2} (7,167/sq mi)
- Demonym(s): Bandüpūryuk, Bandipori, Bandiporiya, Bandipuri, Bandipuria

Languages
  - Official: Kashmiri, Urdu, Hindi, Dogri, English

Demographics
  - Literacy: 75.13%
  - Sex ratio: 838
- Time zone: UTC+5:30 (IST)
- PIN: 193502
- Vehicle registration: JK15
- Website: bandipore.nic.in

Bandipore (English: /ˌbændɪˈpɔː/) or Bandipora (Urdu pronunciation: [bɑːnɖiːpoːɾɑː] ; Kashmiri pronunciation: [banɖɨpuːr]) is the headquarters of district of Bandipore in the Jammu and Kashmir in the disputed Kashmir region. It is located on the northern banks of Wullar Lake—the second-largest freshwater lake in Asia. From baramulla the gateway of bandipora is Kehnusa where bando Bandipora the distanceis 15

== History ==
In 1963, the town of Bandipore was gutted by a fire, which destroyed hundreds of shops and houses. Bakshi Ghulam Mohammad, ex-Prime Minister of Jammu and Kashmir, visited the town soon after the fire and said that the fire took place at the wrong time.

== Geography ==
Bandipore is situated on the banks of the Wular, a large fresh-water lake that is home to a lot of migratory birds. Inadvertent dumping of the polluted river waters and sewage affluence has led to a pandemic growth of algae in the waters of the Wular which is threatening the lake and its supporting life itself. The main source of pollution to Wular is Jhelum River. The Jhelum River carries all the waste from Srinagar city and other surrounding areas and deposits it in Wular. Despite being the richest wetland of South Asia and the largest freshwater lake in Asia, no steps have been taken to save Wular. Bandipore is also a stepping town to the higher reaches of Razdan, Gurez and Tragbal.

The Lolab Valley in Kupwara district is adjacent to the Bandipore. It is just 30 kilometres (19 mi) from Bandipore via Aloosa village. Once this road is upgraded it will become a lifeline of the Lolab valley and it will provide an additional route to the Kupwara district.

Bandipore was the connecting link between North India and Central Asia via the Silk Road. At Pazalpora village there was a customs and immigration department which is now a forest check-post. Due to this fact, Bandipore is also known as the gateway to Central Asia. There are strong links between Skardu, Gurez and Bandipore.

== Demographics ==
Religion in Bandipore Town (2011)
1. Islam (95.0%)
2. Hinduism (4.57%)
3. Sikhism (0.08%)
4. Christianity (0.14%)
5. Buddhism (0.03%)
6. Jainism (0.00%)
7. Not Stated (0.13%)
8. Others (0.01%)

As of 2011 Indian census, Bandipore had a population of 37,081. Males constitute 54% of the population and females 46%. Bandipore has an average literacy rate of 66.53%, lower than the national average of 74%, with 75% of the males and 55% of females literate. Twelve percent of the population is under 6 years of age.

It is a Muslim-majority region, though there were few villages where Pandits also lived before they mass migrated in the early 1990s. The Pandit population was in large numbers at Ajar, Sonerwani, Kaloosa, Kharapora, Mantrigam, Aragam, etc. Some Pandit families at Ajar and Kaloosa did not migrate. The temple at Kaloosa, known as Sharda Mandir, dates back to old times. It has a very big and old tree which is a few hundred years old and is a rare tree of its type. This is popularly known as Bran, a revered tree. There are many villages in this newly formed district named after Hindu gods and goddesses such as Chakreshipora, named after Chakerishwar. The famous Ziariat of Kausar Sahab Afghani is located near Chekreshipora. The forest training school of Kashmir is located in Bandipore. It was established in 1905. This institute is a premier body in the conservation process of the forest department.

The majority of the population speak Kashmiri, some speak Gojri and Pahari, Also Tehsil Gurez and Tulail is Shina-speaking and has a Shina majority. There are few Pashtun villages on the Line of Control. The Kishan Ganga Hydro Electric Power Project is also located in the Gurez Tehsil of Bandipore. The project is worth INR 15000 Crores. Presently it generates 330 MW of electricity for the neighbouring states of Jammu and Kashmir (state).

== Education ==
The literacy rate in the main town of Bandipore and adjoining areas is quite high. However, as per the 2011 census, for the whole district which includes rural area, the literacy rate is one of the lowest in Jammu and Kashmir.With high hopes and great expectations it was only in 2005 that a degree college was granted. It started functioning in higher secondary school Kaloosa. Named after Hassan Khoyihami, the college was established on a hilltop near Patushay village, approximately 4km distance from the main market.

== Attractions ==
=== Nishat Park ===
The famous Nishat Park in Bandipora was constructed in 1954 under the supervision of the then Prime Minister of Jammu and Kashmir, Bakhshi Ghulam Mohammad.Nishat park Bandipora is built in accordance with the Nishat Garden Srinagar and is in the outskirts of main market Bandipora,It features Beautiful and various Flowers and Trees and provide with a quite and relax environment place for the tourists and people of Bandipora.

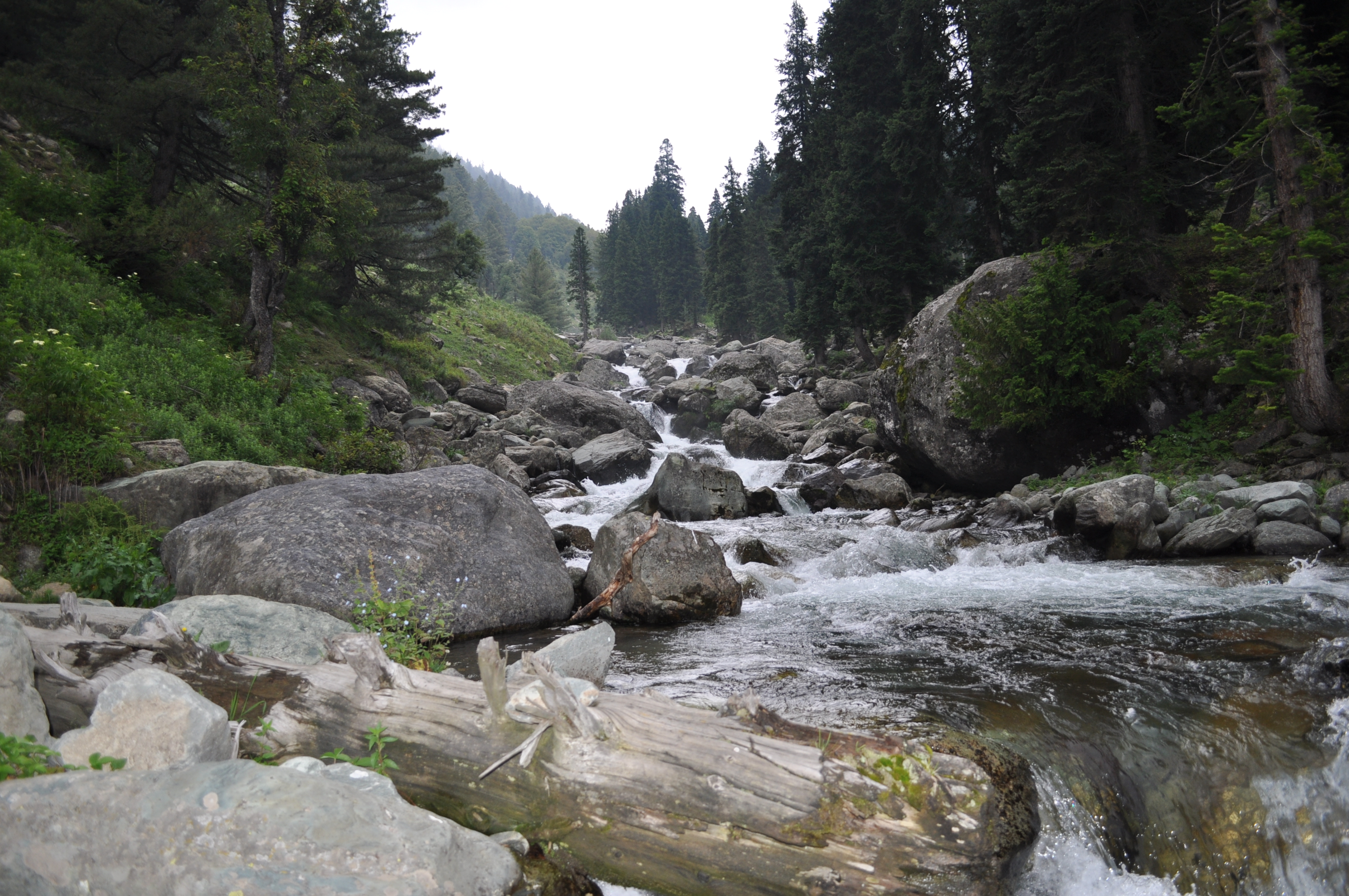
Arin Nallah, trout heaven

=== Forest Training and Research Institute ===
Bandipore is the location of the Forest Training and Research Institute in Jammu and Kashmir [established in 1911]. It is 3km distance from the main town.

Wular Lake

Wular Lake (Urdu pronunciation: [ʋʊlər]), also known as Wolar (Kashmiri pronunciation: [ʋɔlar]) in Kashmiri, is one of the largest fresh water lakes in South Asia. It is located near Bandipora town in the Bandipora district of Jammu and Kashmir, India.The lake basin was formed as a result of tectonic activity and is fed by the Jhelum River and stream Madhumati and Arin.

The lake's size varies seasonally from 30 to 189 square kilometres. In addition, much of the lake has been drained as a result of willow plantations being built on the shore in the 1950s

=== Shrine of Hazrat Syed Jaffar Ud Din Bukhari (RA) ===
Located in Ajas, on the Bandipora–Srinagar Road -Hazrat Syed Jaffar Ud Din Bukhari (RA) was born in the 12th century in the historic city of Bukhara, in present-day Uzbekistan. Coming from a noble lineage known for its piety and deep spiritual roots, he became a towering figure in the spiritual history of the region. His life, marked by devotion and wisdom, left an enduring impact on generations of seekers.

Hazrat Jaffar Ud Din Bukhari (RA) died in the 13th century. His final resting place in Ajas, Bandipora, along the Srinagar Road, has since become a revered shrine. Today, it stands as a serene place of devotion, attracting pilgrims and spiritual seekers who come to draw inspiration and solace from his legacy.

The Darul Uloom Raheemiyyah (School for Philosophers) is the largest religious institution in Jammu and Kashmir. It is the largest Islamic institution of valley headed by Moulana Mohammad Rahmatullah Mir Qasmi.

Bandipore is known for trekking, mountaineering and fishing. Langmarg is one of the beautiful meadows. The famous Arin Nallah is home to one of the most exotic trout (rainbow trout, silver trout and gray trout).

A centuries-old shrine in the hilly Butho village of Bandipora, has till recently attracted visitors from around the world, because it's rumored that Moses, a prophet revered in Abrahamic religions, is buried inside it near an old tree. This shrine of Hazrat Bibi Sang Arifa, is locally known as Ded Mouj. This widespread rumor is a myth.

=== Mount Harmukh ===
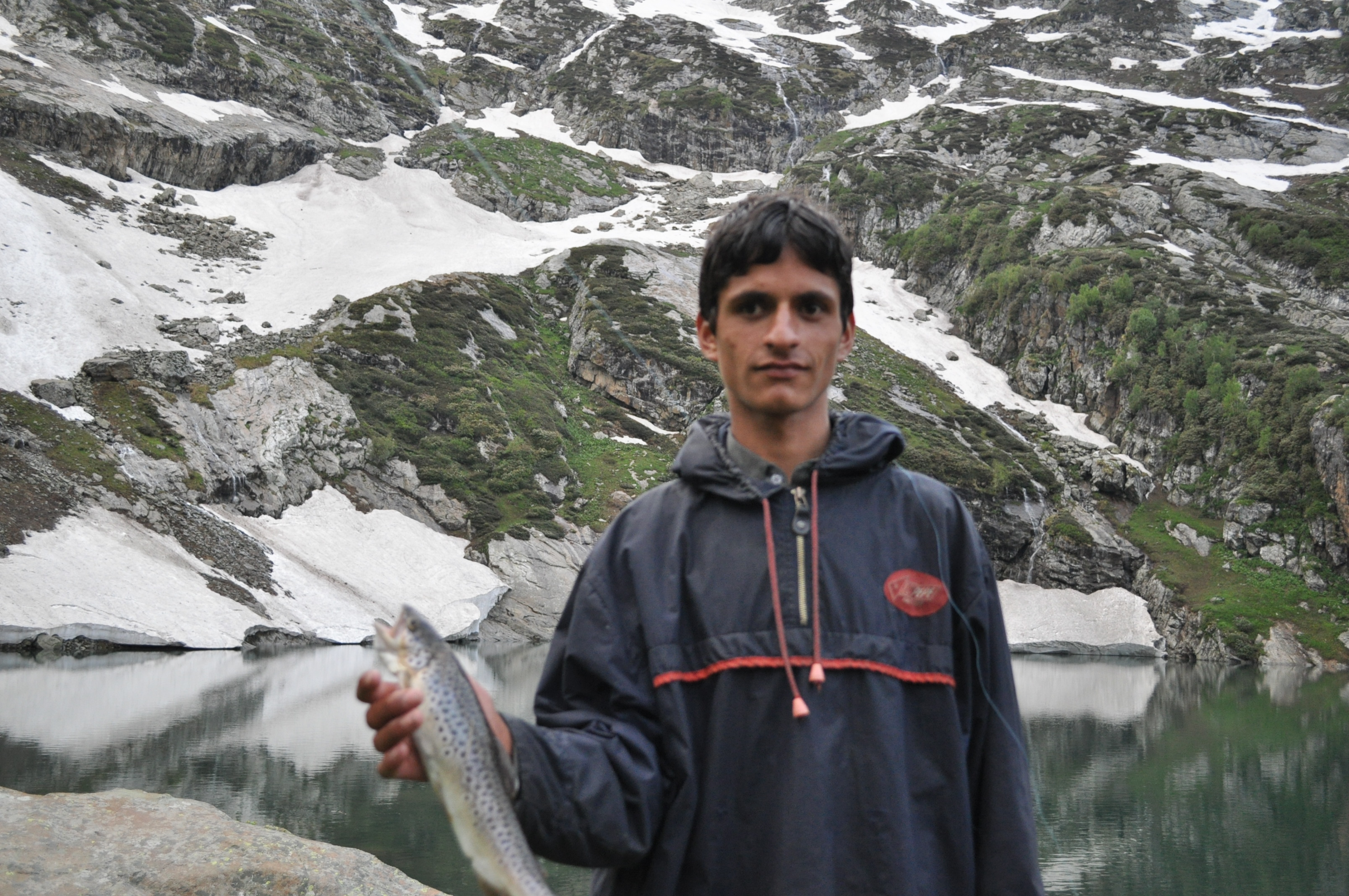
Local trout hunter

For mountaineers, Mount Harmukh remains the main attraction. It is located on the eastern side of the town. Commercial cabs ply on that route till Kudara that is the farthest point where the cabs stop, and from there onwards the terrain becomes hilly and one has to trek 17 kilometres (11 mi) to the higher reaches of Mount Harmukh. Sheera Sar [Lake of Spirits] acts as a base camp for all the mountaineering expeditions for Mt Harmukh. To the north lies Gurez, 86 kilometres (53 mi) from Bandipore. Commercial cabs ply on this route during summers, however, in winters the route remains closed due to heavy snowfall.

The place is surrounded by ranges such as Sirandar, Kudara, Vewan, Mowa and Tresangam, all of which are inhabited by the Gujjars and Bakarwals.

=== Road ===
Bandipore is well-connected by road to other places in Jammu and Kashmir and India by the Bandipora–Srinagar and Bandipora Sopore road.

=== Rail ===
Bandipora is not connected with railways. The nearest railway station is Sopore railway station located at a distance of 34 kilometres.

=== Air ===
The nearest airport is Srinagar Airport located at a distance of 65 kilometres.

== Prominent Personalities ==
- Qazi Ghulam Ali Jan, Assistant Conservator Forest (ACF), Government of Jammu and Kashmir
- Hassan Khoehami (Historian)
- Siyad Kashmiri Abdul Samad Lone (Retired Headmaster and poet)
- Naeem Akhtar (Politician)
- Raheem Lone and Khalil Lone noted hunters documented in Roosevelts book, East of the sun and west of the moon.
- Nizam Uddin Bhat, (Politician)
- Faisal Ali Dar (Social Activist)
- Prof. Manzoor Fazili (Academician and Writer)
- Prof. Mohd Amin Malik (Academician and Columnist).
- Dr. Maroof Shah (Writer)
- Masood Samoon (IAS and Writer)
- Asgar Samoon (IAS)
