= Sopore railway station =

Railway station in Sopore, Baramulla, J&K

Sopore Railway Station
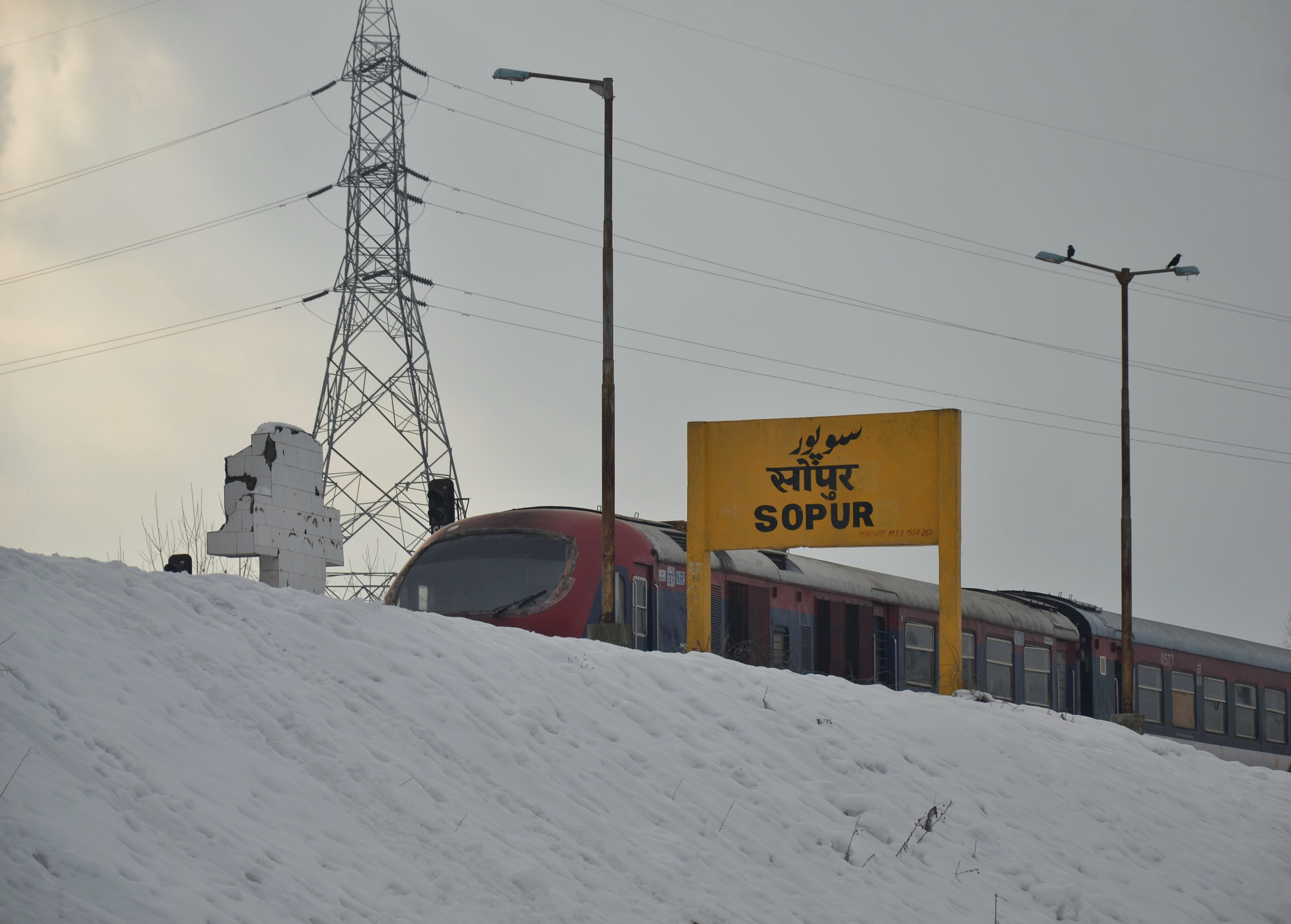
- Train Arriving At Railway Station Sopore

General information
- Location: Sopore, Jammu and Kashmir; India
- Coordinates: 34.2580°N 74.4512°E
- Elevation: 1,589 metres (5,213 ft)
- System: Indian Railways station
- Owner: Indian Railways
- Line: Jammu–Baramulla line
- Platforms: 2
- Tracks: 2

Construction
- Parking: Yes

Other information
- Status: Active
- Station code: SXZM
- Zone(s): Northern Railway
- Division(s): Jammu

History
- Opened: 2008 (18 years ago)
Location

Sopur (or Sopore) Railway Station is situated in the outskirts of Sopore town. It lies on Northern Railway Network Zone of Indian Railways. Sopore is currently the northernmost station of Indian Railways.

== Location ==
The station is located at Amargrah about 2 km from Sopore town towards south on Srinagar-Sopore highway.

== History ==
The station has been built as part of the Jammu–Baramulla line megaproject, intending to link the Kashmir Valley with Jammu Tawi and the Indian railway network.

== Design ==
The station features Kashmiri wood architecture, with an intended ambience of a royal court which is designed to complement the local surroundings to the station. Station signage is predominantly in Urdu, English and Hindi.

== Reduced level ==
The station is situated on R.L. of 1589 m above mean sea level.

== See also ==
- Baramulla railway station
- Srinagar railway station
