= Bandipore district =

District of Jammu and Kashmir

Bandipore district Bandpur Bandipora, Bandipur
- District
- Bandipora
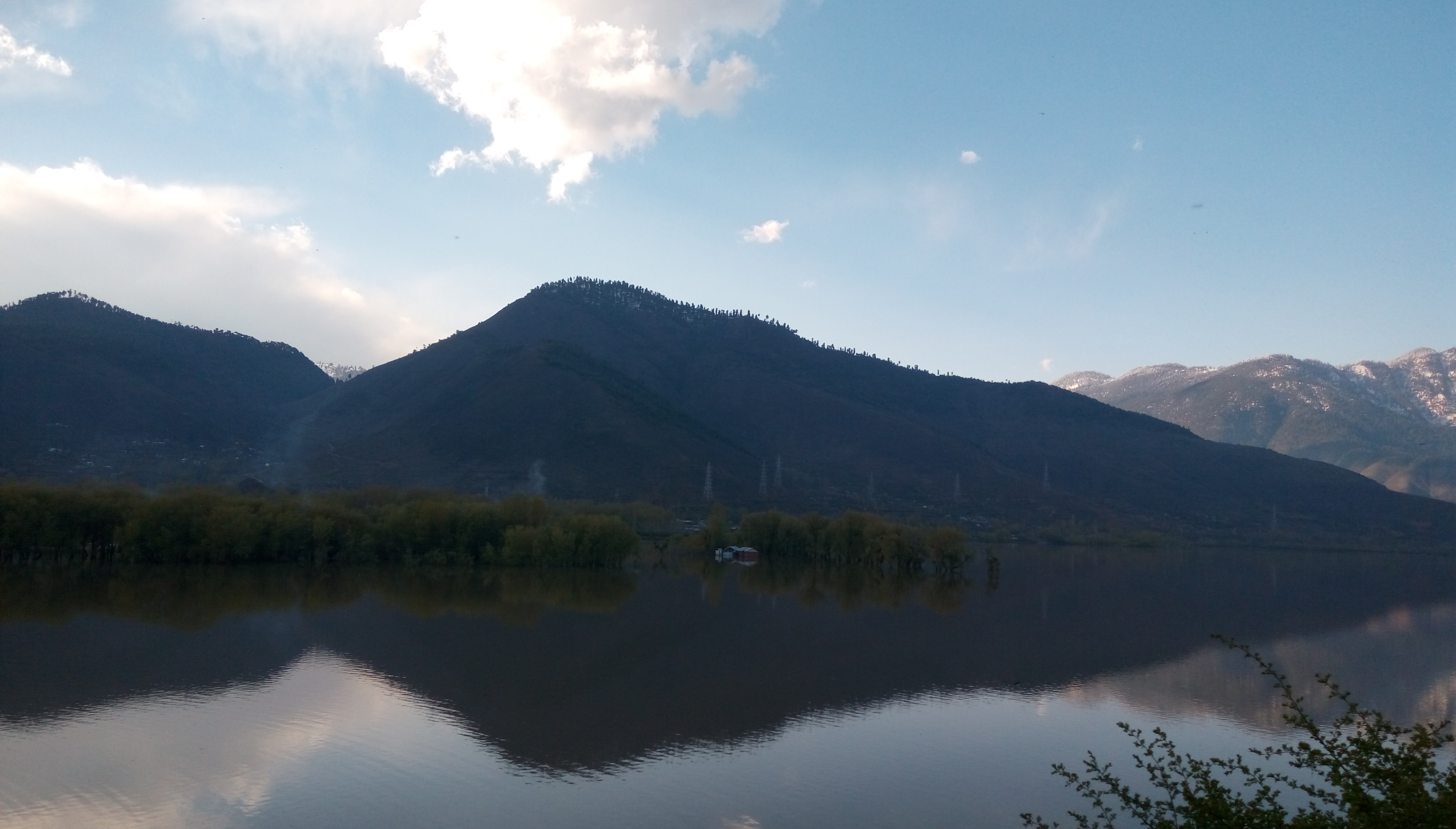
- Wular Lake, largest freshwater lake in India

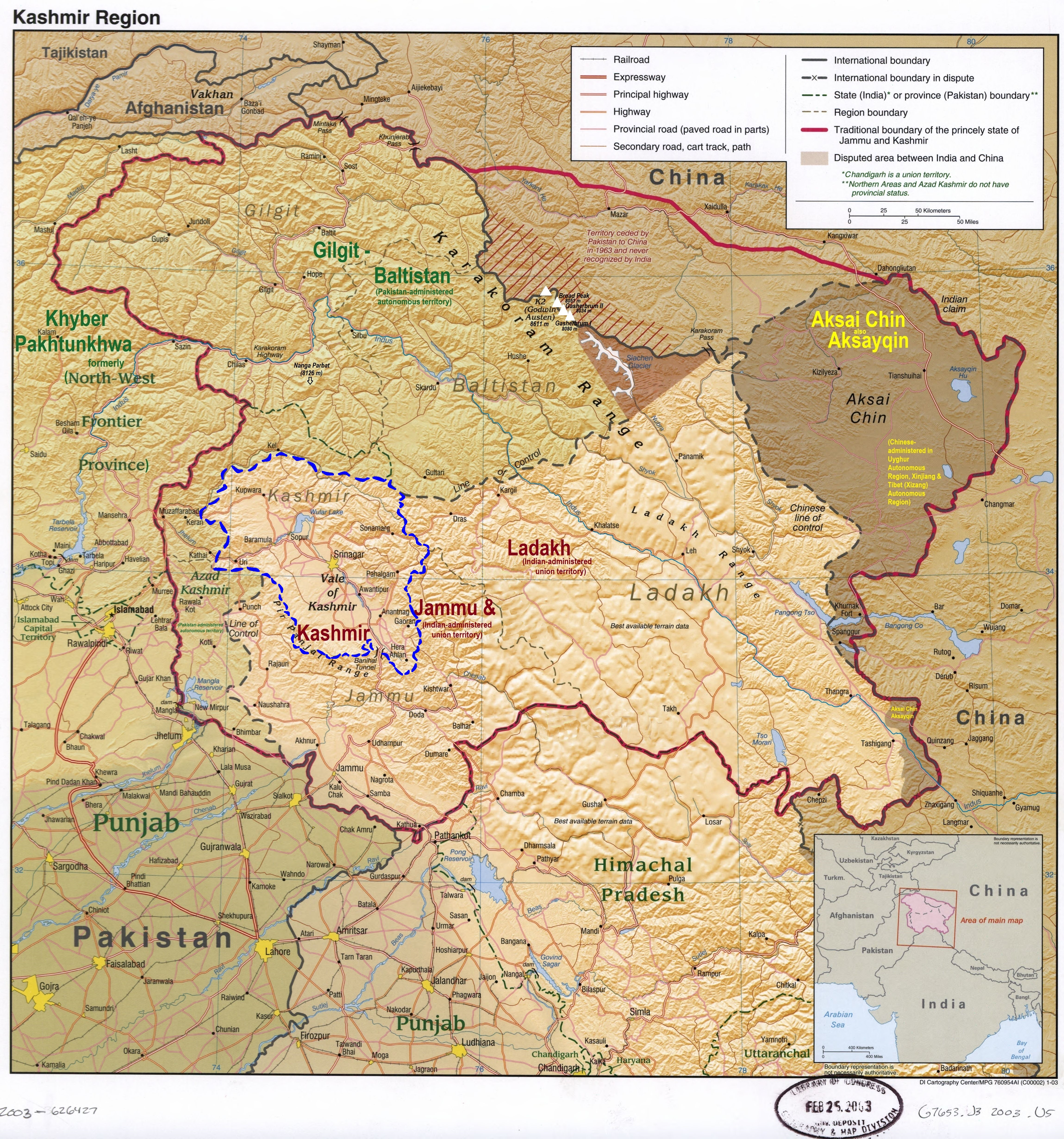
- Bandipore district is in Indian-administered Jammu and Kashmir in the Kashmir region It is in the Kashmir division (bordered in neon blue).
- Interactive map of Bandipore district
- Coordinates (Bandipore): 34°25′12″N 74°39′00″E
- Administering country: India
- Union Territory: Jammu and Kashmir
- Division: Kashmir Division
- Established: 2007
- Seat: Bandipore

Government
  - MLA: Nizam Uddin Bhat (INC)
  - DDC: Vacant

Area
  - Total: 2,475 km^{2} (956 sq mi)
  - Urban: 50 km^{2} (19 sq mi)
  - Rural: 2,425 km^{2} (936 sq mi)

Population (2011)
  - Total: 392,232
  - Density: 158.5/km^{2} (410.5/sq mi)
- Demonym: Bandporuek

Languages
  - Official: Kashmiri, Urdu, Hindi, Dogri, English
- Time zone: Indian Standard Time
- Postal code: 193502
- Deputy commissioner: Indu Kanwal Chib
- Superintendent of Police: Lakshya Sharma, IPS
- Website: bandipore.nic.in

Bandipore district (also spelt as Bandipora or Bandpur) is an administrative district of Indian-administered Jammu and Kashmir in the disputed Kashmir region. It is one of the 20 districts in the Jammu and Kashmir. Bandipore town is the administrative headquarters of the district. Bandipore is located in the foothills of the snow-clad peaks of Harmukh overlooking the shores of Wular Lake and has produced hundreds of scholars and intellectuals. The district is known for its tourist places such as Wular Vintage Park, Athwatoo and Gurez valley. Before 1947, this town was a big trade and literary centre of Kashmir. This district was carved out from the erstwhile Baramulla district in 2007. The district is bounded by Kupwara district from the north, Baramulla district from west, Ganderbal district from the east, Kargil district in Ladakh, Neelum District in Pakistan-administered Azad Kashmir and Astore district in Pakistan-administered Gilgit-Baltistan . Bandipore district is the only district in Kashmir Division that shares border with Pakistan-administered Gilgit-Baltistan region. This district occupies an area of 398 km^{2}. The district has a population of 392,232 as per 2011 census.

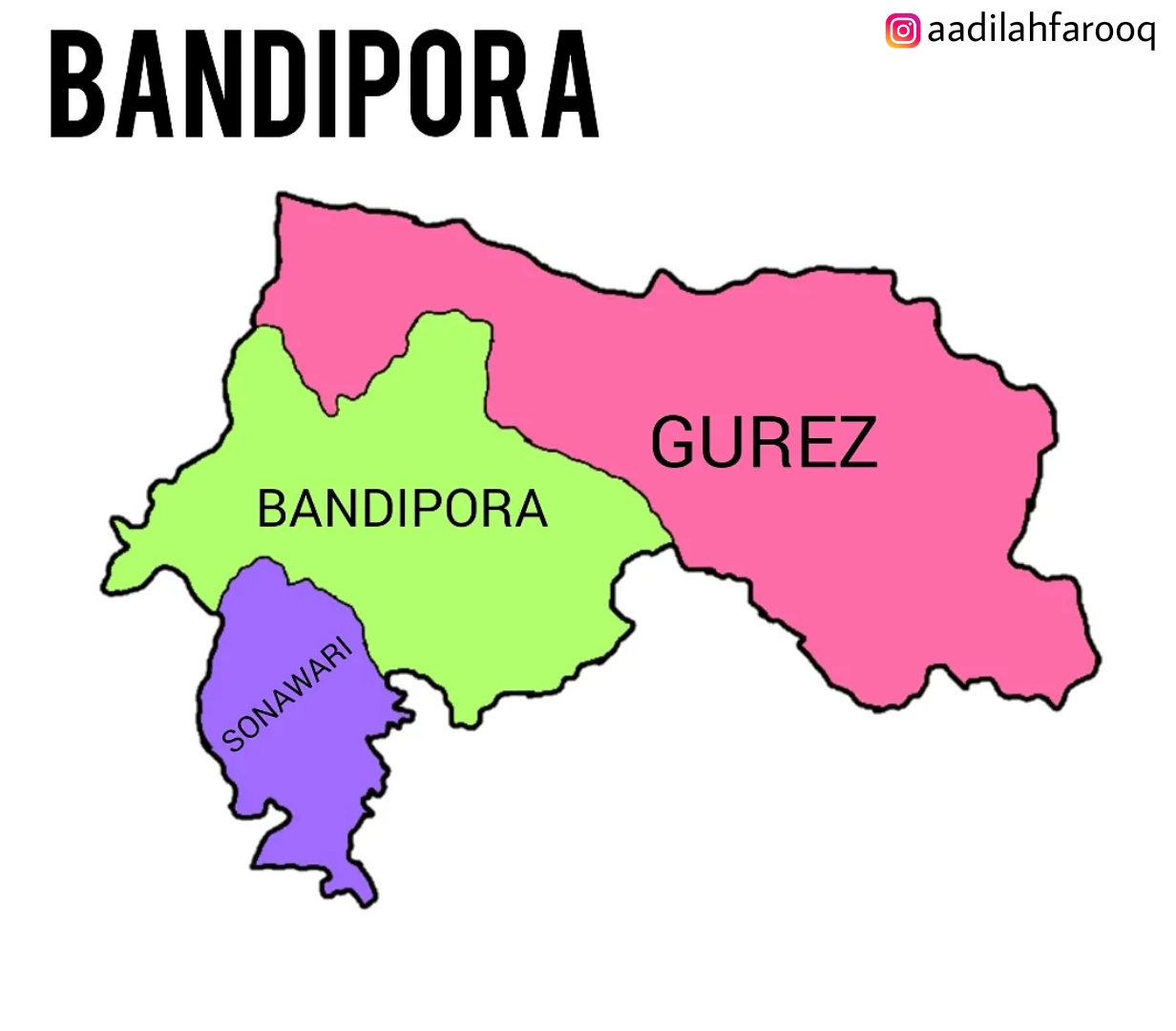
District map of Bandipora

== Administration ==
=== District Development Council ===
- DDC Chairperson Bandipora: Abdul Gani Bhat (JKNC)
- Vice-chairperson: Kaunser Shafeeq (INC)

S.No	Party	Alliance	No. of Members
1.	INC	UPA	1
2.	BJP	NDA	1
3.	JKNC	PAGD	4
4.	JKPDP	PAGD	2
5.	JKAP		1
6.	JKPM		1
7.	Independent		4
Totak			14

== Education ==
Some of the institutions and colleges of Bandipur which provide quality education to the students of district Bandipore.

- Govt HKM Degree College Patushay
- Govt Degree College Gurez
- Krishi Vigyan Kendra Patushay
- Islamiya Model School Patushay
- Govt Middle School Patushay
- Govt Girls Higher Secondary School, Plan Bandipora
- Govt NM Boys Higher School Kaloosa
- Govt Higher Secondary school Quilmuqam
- Govt Polytechnic College Bandipora
- Kendriya Vidyalaya BSF Bandipur.
- Al-Noor College Of Education moder
- Mehboobul Aalam College Of Education
- Govt High School Bagh]
- Govt High School Qazipora bandipora
- Muslim Model School Qazipora Watapora
- Army Good Will School Aythmulla
- Shaheen College Of Education
- Govt Higher Sec. School Nadihal
- Govt Higher Sec. School Aloosa
- Govt Higher Sec. School Aragam
- Govt Secondary School Mantrigam
- Govt Secondary School Bonakoot
- Eaglets Public Secondary School Plan
- SMS Islamia Model Higher Secondary School, Garoora
- Government Higher Secondary School, Arin

== Divisions ==
The district comprises seven tehsils: Ajas, Aloosa, Bandipore, Sumbal, Hajin, Gurez and Tulail. The district has three Vidhan Sabha constituencies: Gurez, Bandipore and Sonawari. All of these are part of Baramulla Lok Sabha constituency. The district comprises twelve community development blocks: Aloosa, Arin, Baktoor, Bandipore, Bonkoot, Ganastan, Gurez, Hajin, Naidkhai, Nowgam, Sumbal and Tulail.

== Demographics ==
Religion in Bandipore district (2011)
Religion	Percent
Islam	97.39%
Hinduism	2.15%
Other or not stated	0.46%

Sex Ratio in Bandipore District in 2011 Census. (no. females per 1,000 males)
Religion (and population)	Sex Ratio
Muslim (pop 382,006)	926
Hindu (pop 8,439)	47
Other (pop 1,787)	378
Total (pop 392,232)	889

According to the 2011 census Bandipore district has a population of 392,232, roughly equal to the nation of Maldives. This gives it a ranking of 561st in India (out of a total of 640). The district has a population density of 1,117 inhabitants per square kilometre (2,890/sq mi) . Its population growth rate over the decade 2001–2011 was 26.31%. Bandipore has a sex ratio of 899 females for every 1000 males (this varies with religion), and a literacy rate of 57.82%. 16.66% of the population lives in urban areas. Scheduled Castes and Scheduled Tribes make up 0.10% and 19.22% of the population respectively.

Bandipore district: religion, gender ratio, and % urban of population, according to the 2011 Census.
	Hindu	Muslim	Christian	Sikh	Buddhist	Jain	Other	Not stated	Total
Total	8,439	382,006	572	555	44	17	2	597	392,232
Total	2.15%	97.39%	0.15%	0.14%	0.01%	0.00%	0.00%	0.15%	100.00%
Male	8,061	198,322	380	520	40	8	0	349	207,680
Female	378	183,684	192	35	4	9	2	248	184,552
Gender ratio (% female)	4.5%	48.1%	33.6%	6.3%	9.1%	52.9%	100.0%	41.5%	47.1%
Sex ratio (no. of females per 1,000 males)	47	926	505	67	–	–	–	711	889
Urban	2,549	62,557	91	50	18	2	2	92	65,361
Rural	5,890	319,449	481	505	26	15	0	505	326,871
% Urban	30.2%	16.4%	15.9%	9.0%	40.9%	11.8%	100.0%	15.4%	16.7%

Languages of Bandipore district (2011)
1. Kashmiri (78.0%)
2. Gojri (8.82%)
3. Shina (8.62%)
4. Pahari (1.91%)
5. Hindi (1.27%)
6. Others (1.43%)

At the time of the 2011 census, 82.39% of the population spoke Kashmiri, 8,82% Gojri, 8.18% Shina, 1.91% Pahari and 1.27% Hindi as their first language.

=== Places ===
Shrine of Hazrat Syed Jaffar Ud Din Bukhari (RA)

Located in Ajas, on the Bandipora–Srinagar Road -Hazrat Syed Jaffar Ud Din Bukhari (RA) was born in the 12th century in the historic city of Bukhara, in present-day Uzbekistan. Coming from a noble lineage known for its piety and deep spiritual roots, he became a towering figure in the spiritual history of the region. His life, marked by devotion and wisdom, left an enduring impact on generations of seekers.

Hazrat Jaffar Ud Din Bukhari (RA) passed away in the 13th century. His final resting place in Ajas, Bandipora, along the Srinagar Road, has since become a revered shrine. Today, it stands as a serene place of devotion, attracting pilgrims and spiritual seekers who come to draw inspiration and solace from his legacy.

== See also ==
- Wular Lake
- Gurez Valley
- Patushay
- Bandipore
- Bandipora Assembly constituency
