= Kahori =

- Gender: Female
- Language: Japanese

Origin
- Region of origin: Japan

Other names
- Alternative spelling: Kahhori

Kahori may refer to:

- Kahori, Azad Kashmir, a town in Pakistan
- Kahori Uchiyama (内山 佳保里; born 1975), Japanese rower
- Kahhori, a fictional character in the television series What If...?

== See also ==
- Kahore, a union council in Pakistan
- Kahoru, another Japanese feminine given name
