= Battle of Chunj =

1948 battle during the First Kashmir war

- Part of the Indo-Pakistani war of 1947–1948
- The Chunj feature on a map
Date	25 June – 23 November 1948
Location	Tithwal, Jammu and Kashmir 34°25′04″N 73°44′39″E
Result	Pakistani victory
Territorial changes	Pakistan takes control over various points (Note: Point 7229, Point 4207, Point 6953, as well as the entire Pir Sahaba and Ring Contour.) including the Chunj feature.

Belligerents
India: Indian Army; Indian Air Force	Pakistan: Pakistan Army

Commanders and leaders
Gen. K. S. Thimayya; Brig. Harbaksh Singh; Brig. J. C. Katoch	Maj. A. M. Sloan † (Note: Alan Macfarlane Sloan was a British soldier, who later joined the Pakistani Army and was killed at Chunj.); Maj. Ghulam Rasul Raja; Capt. Rao Farman Ali; Lt. Nausherwan Khan (Note: Lieutenant Nausherwan khan was given the code name 'Kamal'.)

Units involved
163rd Brigade; 1st Sikh; 1st Madras Pioneers; 3rd Royal Garhwal Rifles	4th Battalion, 16th Punjab Regiment; 3rd Battalion, 12th Frontier Force Regiment

Casualties and losses
Unknown	42 killed, 169 wounded

The Battle of Chunj, also known as the Chunj Operation, was a military campaign fought between Pakistani and Indian forces from 25 June until 23 November 1948, during the Indo-Pakistani war of 1947–1948. The Indian 163rd Brigade first advanced from Handwara to Tithwal and from Uri to Urusa. The 163rd Brigade then launched an offensive from Tithwal, raising a threat to Pakistani-held Muzaffarabad. The move caused much panic in the Pakistani high command. The capture of Domel (Note: Domel, also spelt as Domail, is a subdistrict in Muzaffarabad city.) was the main objective of the Indian offensive. Domel, only 18 miles (29 km) from Tithwal, was a key position for the Pakistan Army to hold in Muzaffarabad.

The 10th Brigade of the Pakistan Army, under Brigadier Haji Iftikhar Ahmad, was tasked to stop the Indian advance, and defend Muzaffarabad at all costs. The Pakistani high command also consider it necessary to drive out the Indian troops from the heights of the Chunj range and push the Indian troops back to the left bank of the Neelum River, also known as the Kishanganga River. Because of the evacuation of all the advanced positions across the river, the Indian command considered it a major loss.

The Indian forces had gained success by capturing Tithwal earlier, but with the fall of the Chunj feature to Pakistan, the summer offensive of the Indian army from Tithwal towards Muzaffarabad failed. The Pakistani advance added a huge area to the Pakistani controlled side on the left bank of the Neelum River. Major Alan Macfarlane Sloan, a British engineer officer and professional soldier fighting for the Pakistanis, was praised for his actions which led to the capture of crucial peaks in the Tithwal area in July 1948. The Pakistani forces switched their focus towards the Chakothi area after achieving victory in Tithwal. Later, another victory in Pandu by the Pakistanis pushed the Indians out of the Pandu feature, a commanding position over other nearby features, a noteworthy achievement in the conflict. Stalemate ensued afterwards in this sector until ceasefires took effect on 1 January 1949.

== Background ==
In May 1948, the Indian 163rd Brigade launched an offensive in Tithwal sector which raised the threat to Muzaffarabad after their forces advanced from Handwara to Tithwal and from Uri to Urusa. The advance caused much panic and desperation in the Pakistani high command. The capture of Domel was the main objective of the Indian offensive. Domel, only 18 miles (29 km) from Tithwal, is a neighborhood in Muzaffarabad, and was a formidable key position for the Pakistani command to defend and hold.

The 10th Brigade of the Pakistan Army under Brigadier Haji Iftikhar Ahmad was tasked to stop the Indian advance and defend Muzaffarabad at all costs. The Pakistani high command also considered it necessary to drive out the Indian troops from the heights of the Chunj range and push the Indian troops back to the left bank of the Neelum River. The 4th Battalion of the 16th Punjab regiment was also called into the warzone in Kashmir from Abbottabad right after finishing Operation Curzon on 29 February 1948.

It was tasked to halt the advance of Indian troops from the road of Domel to Uri, consisting of troops formed from Azad Kashmir and tribesmen excluding the regiments own troops. Then later in 24 May it was instructed to immediately move in Tithwal sector. The regular troops of India and Pakistan fought each other from May onward.

=== Plan ===
Pir Sahaba ridge, Point 7302 and Point 7229 were occupied by the Indian forces after facing a lack of opposition from Pakistani troops. After the reconnaissance sortie made by Colonel Khan, he called a session related to their approach to the positions of the Indian forces. Colonel Khan ascertained the intentions and strength of the Indian troops, and informed his team about the detailed intelligence available to him. His plan was to use attrition warfare to distort the Indian advance by using selective groups.

These groups were to inflict maximum attrition on Indian forces and occupy the heights within the given rations and ammo. This led to confusion among the Indian forces, and would result in their troops regrouping for the defense of the area. Colonel Khan would make further reconnaissance sorties and partner with raiding patrols. The unit successfully halted the Indian advance by deceiving them.

Pakistani Colonel Nausherwan Khan and his battalion acquainted themselves with their routes and their aims. A plan was made to capture the Chunj feature (Point 9444), the preliminary objective explained to all the soldiers of the 4th Battalion, 16th Punjab Regiment (4/16 Punjab) on 25 June. The next step was to drive out the Indian forces from Point 7229 and Point 6953, which were high peaks and dominated the main tracks along the Neelum.

== Battle ==
All the bridges between Tithwal and Keran were destroyed by Indian troops to prevent Pakistani troops from accessing the western bank of the Neelum River while the concentration of Pakistan forces on the eastern bank continued. The Indian positions beyond the Neelum at the ring contour and Point 7229 were attacked by two groups of Pakistani forces covertly through the smoke coming out of mortar fire on 24 June, but the attack was repulsed. At Tithwal, after this engagement, shelling increased on Indian positions including the ring contour from Point 9444 and the 1st Madras Pioneers Headquarters for the whole day.

Colonel Khan organized the force responsible for driving Indian troops away from the Chunj Heights. Khan called a session with his troops, engineers, and gunners, who agreed to deploy a QF 3.7-inch mountain howitzer, nicknamed the Shahzadi, (Note: Shahzadi means princess; it was called princess because it was handled with care.) on Point 9444 for gunfire assistance. A track 25 miles (40 km) long was created for mules from Muzaffarabad since no proper track existed. A sling and pulley was used to dismantle the artillery gun as well as boxes full of ammunition brought beyond the Kahori River across the Neelum. Once the gun reached the point, it was put together and the engineers then removed the Indian mines and built tracks besides the other river. The construction of the bridge was achieved within a short span time, and the artillery piece, the Shahzadi, was transported with the help of 70 porters. By 30 June, the entire battalion had moved and concentrated in the Ban Forest area.

=== Attack on Point 6953 and capture of Point (4207) ===
The Pakistani forces took up the offensive soon after they were briefed on the plan, which was created to accomplish the eventual goal of capturing the dominating features from the Indians. On 25 June, an officer with a unit the size of a platoon was sent by the Pakistanis to clear and take control of Point 4207. (Note: The name given to Point 4207 was Pimple.) The Indian force launched their defense with all of their available artillery and machine guns, but the Pakistani forces arrived unharmed due to the darkness. Leaving two dead and a significant amount of ammunition and equipment behind, the Indian troops ultimately withdrew from the area.

On 8 July 1948, Pakistani troops took their positions in the Ban Forest undetected. 3rd Madras, a new and recently-inducted Indian unit holding the defense was unaware of the movement of the Pakistani troops, who had already reached their gathering place. The Pakistani dispatch rider kept his motorbike on to make it appear as if tanks were present. These early actions facilitated the subsequent attack. In the early morning hours, the first wave of the assault commenced. The assault on Point 6953, descending from Point 9444, took place along a narrow ridgeline. This made a conventional two-company frontal attack impossible. Instead, A Company led the attack but faced a delay. Several Indian bunkers were destroyed with direct hits from Pakistani artillery early on in the engagement.

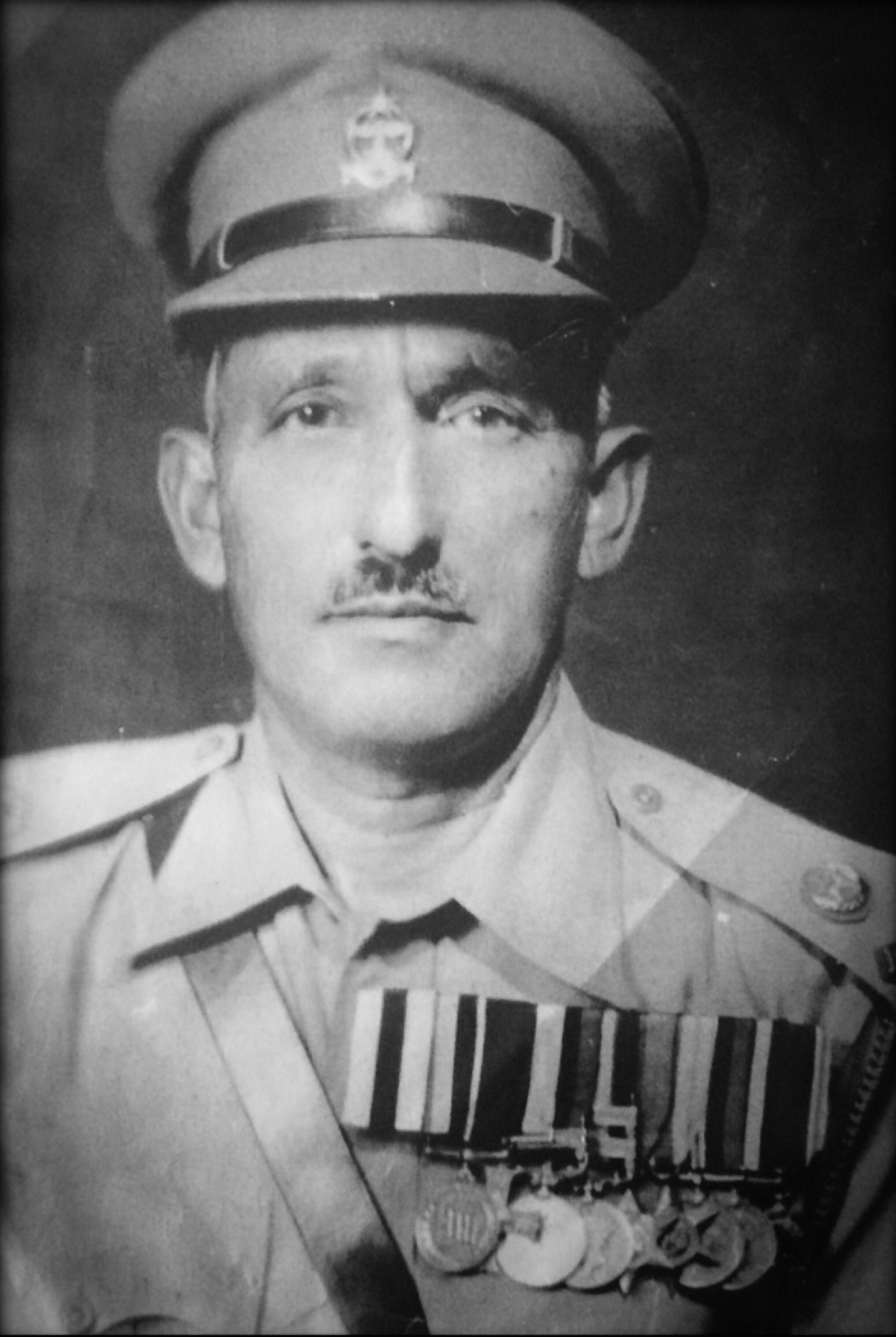
Lt. Col. (later Major) Ghulam Rasul Raja.

After shelling Point 7229 and the ring contour for thirty minutes, Major Ghulam Rasul Raja, whose advance was hindered by a single Indian machine gun position, decided to approach it from the southwest, targeting their rear from the vantage point of the nearby village of Chilean. The logistics of the move took several hours to arrange. Meanwhile, A Company had managed to capture part of the Indian defenses. By night time, the Pakistani B company reached the Indian positions. After intense hand-to-hand combat and heavy Indian casualties, the Pakistanis captured Point 6953. The Indian force abandoned their positions and lost 30 dead and 13 prisoners. After receiving no fire support from their deeper positions, the remaining Indian troops surrendered.

=== Capture of Point 7229 ===
An Indian platoon ordered to backup the ring contour was engaged by Pakistani troops and shelling. Meanwhile, the Indian machine gun section at Point 7229 gave cover to the force which retreated to a false crest. Pakistani forces used deception to capitalize on Indian concerns about an impending counterattack on the Keran position. Two companies of the Indian forces were given orders to attack Shardi on 7 July and set off for this mission on 8 July. After they were informed that the ring contour had been captured, they returned to their previous positions by 9 July.

On 9 July, D and C Companies advanced to initiate the second phase of the Pakistani operation. Orders were given which indicated that Point 7229 had been evacuated and both companies were to advance immediately. The Indian forces, in a state of panic, blew up the bridge located at Tithwal while retreating across the Neelum. The Pakistani unit requested permission to pursue the retreating Indian troops across the river, but the request was denied. The Indian forces planned a counter-attack to retake the ring contour and requested an airstrike on the Pakistani position. However, the airstrike did not materialize.

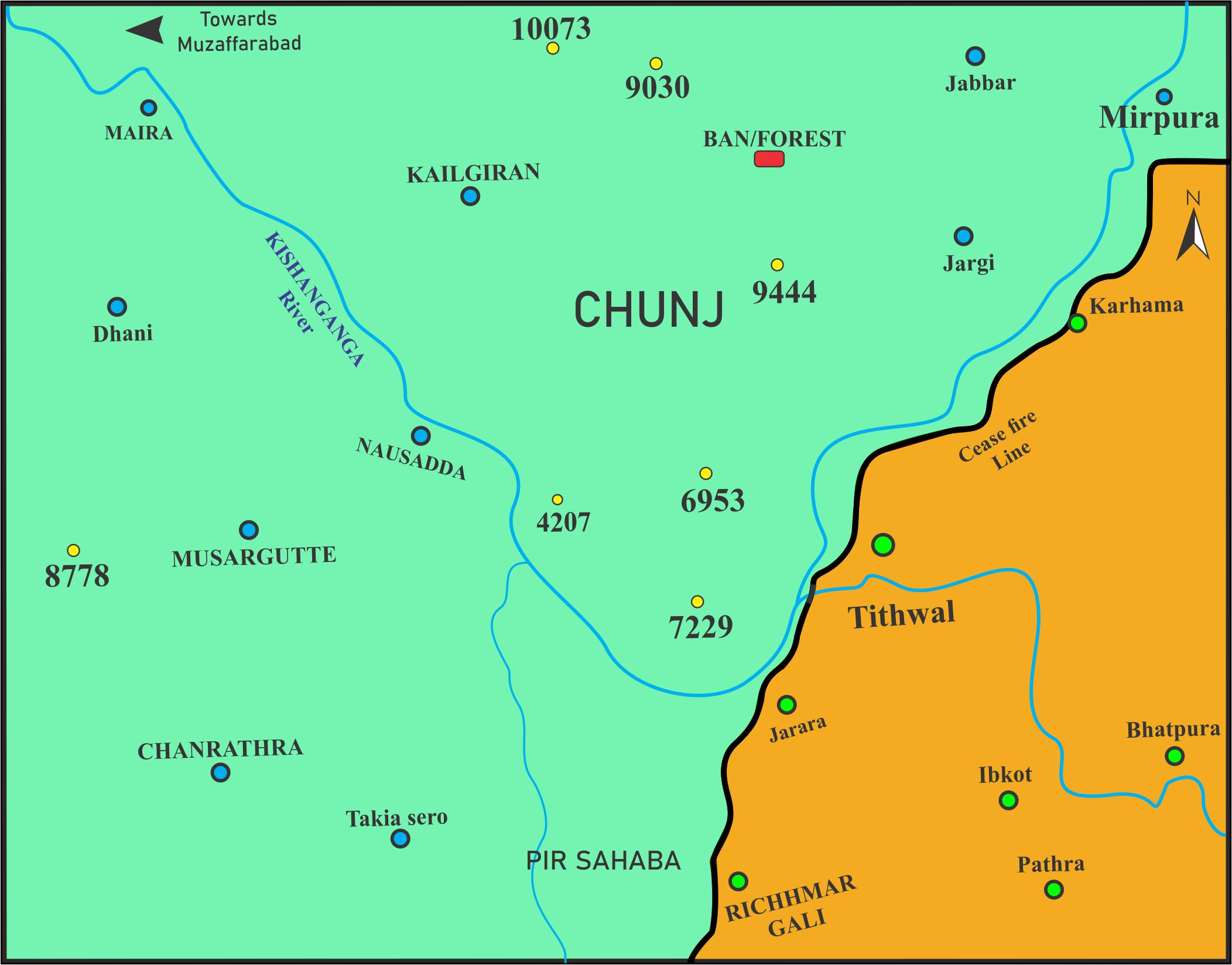
Map of features in the Chunj area.

The Indian brigade commander instructed his troops to withdraw, and also to blow up the bridge beyond the river. The Indian troops had withdrawn along with their equipment and heavy arms from the Neelum after facing attacks. The Pakistani troops then captured Point 7229 after they saw it unoccupied.

=== Indian forces retreat ===
At the Neelum, eight Indian platoons were spread throughout its banks, including the group at the false crest who were engaged by Pakistani troops during their retreat. At Tithwal ridge, all of the machine guns were assembled and the Indian forces withdrew under the cover of an IAF jet which bombarded the Pakistani troops for 20 minutes. Meanwhile the Indian sappers prepared to destroy the bridge and it was destroyed after two attempts. Two Indian platoons were ordered to collect ammunition which was stored close to the Neelum and Jarara rivers. Pakistani troops shelled these platoons and they drew back. The IAF jets again bombarded the Pakistani positions and the Indian troops made their way back while another party destroyed the tracks at the junction.

North of Tithwal, an Indian picket was attacked, and all the positions there were abandoned. Following this, the Pakistani 3rd Battalion, 12th Frontier Force Regiment (3/12 FF) was ordered to move immediately and occupy the Pir Sahaba feature. On 10 July, the Pir Sahaba feature was occupied by Pakistani troops in the morning, after they confirmed it had been abandoned by Indian forces. The 8th Punjab Regiment took over the positions from the previous battalion, who were sent back to their homes on November 23, 1948, and the Chunj operation was concluded.

== Aftermath ==
Because of the evacuation of all the advanced positions across the Neelum River, the Indian command considered the operation to be a major loss. The commanding officer of 1st Madras considered the brigade headquarters to have made tactical errors and obstacles, including not occupying Point 9444. The major of 163rd Brigade disputed the allegations and insisted that the troops were demoralized, which he claimed led to the loss. General Thimayya therefore held no one accountable for the failure.

The Indian forces had gained success by capturing Tithwal before the Battle of Chunj, but after the fall of the Chunj feature to Pakistan, the summer offensive of the Indian army failed to advance to Muzaffarabad and was forced behind their starting position. The subsequent campaign added a huge area to the Pakistani controlled side on the left bank of the Neelum River. The Pakistani forces switched their focus towards the Chakothi area after achieving a victory in Tithwal, which later included another victory in Pandu by pushing out 2nd Bihar from the Pandu feature which overlooked the other key features. A stalemate ensued in this sector until the ceasefire went into place on 1 January 1949.

According to Indian officer Srinivas Kumar Sinha, "For the present, however, we had to accept the fact that the weather, the terrain and Pakistan's fresh reinforcements had prevented us from reaching our goal Domel. Yet our gains had been substantial and in this respect we had got the better of the enemy.

=== Military honours ===
Major Sloan was leading his soldiers during a mine clearing operation, during which he lost his footing and fell down a slope, triggering a tripwire which blew up a mine. The Major received serious injuries, along with another Pakistani soldier, Lance Naik Aman Khan. Sloan's injuries in the line of duty later proved to be fatal. Major Sloan died on 10 July 1948. Major Sloan was praised for his actions which led to the capture of crucial peaks in the Tithwal sector in July 1948. His body was taken to the British Cemetery in Abbottabad and buried there with full military honours. He remains the only British soldier to die in action for Pakistan.

The operations conducted by the 4th Battalion of the 16th Punjab Regiment were applauded, and the battalion was awarded 4 Imtiazi Sanad, 4 Sitara-e-Jurat and 9 Tamgha-e-Jurat.

== See also ==
- Tithwal
- Battle of Shalateng
- Battle of Pandu
- Battle of Badgam
- Battle of Rawalakot
- Indo-Pakistani war of 1947–1948

Preceded by Battle of Tithwal	Indo-Pakistani war of 1947–1948	Succeeded by Battle of Pandu
