= Chilhana =

Chilhana چلہانہ Chilehana
- village
- Location in Azad Kashmir Chilhana (Pakistan)
- Coordinates: 34.39166°N 73.76953°E
- Administrative territory: Pakistan
- State: Azad Kashmir
- Districts of Pakistan: Neelum District
- Tehsils of Azad Kashmir: Athmuqam Tehsil
- Time zone: UTC+05:00 (PST)

Chilhana or Chilehana (Note: also Chilliana) (چلہانہ; Potwari: [t͡ʃɪlˈĕjaːɳa]; Urdu: [t͡ʃɪlˈɦɑːnɑ]) is a border village in the Azad Kashmir. It lies upon the Neelum River, close to the Line of Control (LOC) in the Athmuqam Tehsil of the Neelam Valley District, neighbouring the village of Teetwal, in Jammu Kashmir, India, in the wider disputed Kashmir region.

== History ==
The villages of Chilhana and Teetwal were connected with families residing in both villages. Following the Partition of Indian subcontinent in 1948, the villages were divided, separating families.

== Geography ==
The village lies upon the Line of Control (LOC) and located 25 miles (40 km) away from the capital Muzaffarabad.

== Transport ==
A 160-ft-long suspension bridge built in 1931 served as a link between the two villages. In 1948 it was demolished, before being jointly rebuilt in 1988. In April 2005 as a cross-Line of Control (LoC) initiative, it was established as a foot-crossing connecting families in Muzaffarabad in Azad Kashmir with Srinagar in Indian-administered Jammu and Kashmir, with the crossing point located at Chilhana village. Following the revocation of Article 370, the crossing was suspended in 2019.
