= Alan Macfarlane Sloan =

British soldier (1925–1948)

Major Alan Macfarlane Sloan
- Born: 20 April 1925; Beckenham, Greater London
- Died: 10 July 1948 (aged 23); Chunj, Kashmir
- Cause of death: Mine explosion
- Burial place: Abbottabad
- Military career
- Allegiance: British Raj (1943–1947); Pakistan (1947–1948)
- Branch: British Indian Army (1943–1947); Pakistan Army (1947–1948)
- Service years: 1943–1948
- Rank: Major
- Known for: Only British soldier to die in service of the Pakistani Army
- Conflicts: World War II; Indo-Pakistani war of 1947–1948; Battle of Chunj †

Alan MacFarlane Sloan (20 April 1925 – 10 July 1948) was a British officer, who fought in World War II, and for the Pakistan Army. During the Indo-Pakistani war of 1947–1948, he led the Pakistani engineering brigades and is known for his contributions in the Battle of Chunj and being the only British soldier to die in service of the Pakistan Army. He was born in 1925 in Beckenham, Kent. He was transferred to India in 1944 and, after Partition, he arrived in Pakistan on 18 October 1947 and joined the 71st Field Company of Pakistan Army Engineers. His services led to him being promoted to major the next month.

India-Pakistan tensions boiled over and started the Indo-Pakistani war of 1947–1948. During the Battle of Chunj It was decided to move the 3.7'' howitzer gun, nicknamed Shehzadi, (Note: Shehzadi means princess; it was called princess because it was handled with care.) to Point 9444 after dismantling it, owing to the absence of a paved or proper route. The 71st Engineering Brigade under Sloan was said to have worked day and night to make the track fit for the artillery piece to be transported by mules. With the help of a sling and pulley, the dismantled gun was pulled across the Kishanganga (Neelum River) at Ghori.

Shehzadi was reassembled in two days. After achieving this feat, the 71st Engineers set to work clearing mines and fixing paths for logistics. While leading his soldiers during a mine clearing operation, Sloan fell down a slope and triggered a tripwire which blew up a mine, which proved fatal. His body was taken to the British Cemetery in Abbottabad and buried there with full military honours.

== Early life ==
Alan MacFarlane Sloan was born on 20 April 1925 in Beckenham, Kent. His father, Cuthbert Hannington Sloan, was a lawyer.

=== Postings, courses and operations in India (1944–1947) ===
Sloan joined the Royal Engineers in February 1943. He was transferred to India in 1944, where he was attached to several units. In October 1945, he joined the Engineering Officer Training Institute in Roorkee, for training in specialised engineering. While there, he also learnt to speak Urdu, which was a prerequisite for any officer posted in India.

He was commissioned as a second lieutenant in the Royal Engineers in June 1945 and posted to Bengal Engineer Group. This was part of the British Indian Army before partition. Subsequently, Sloan was promoted to captain and posted as second-in-command to the 68th Field Engineers Company in June 1947.

== Pakistan Army and First Kashmir war ==
The Partition of India plan on 3 June 1947 resulted into the division of the Indian subcontinent into two dominions, India and Pakistan. Consequently, all military assets were split into the relatively new Pakistan Army and the Indian Army. From the estimated requirement of 4,000 officers for Pakistani Armed Forces, only 2,300 were actually available. The neutral British officers were asked to fill in the gap and nearly 500 volunteered along with many Polish and Hungarian officers to run the medical corps.

To overcome the problem of an insufficient number of officers, it was proposed that former British soldiers were brought into Pakistan Army service for almost a year. This proposal was taken to the high command of the British Indian Army, who accepted it. Following this, 474 British officers, including Sloan, volunteered to join the Pakistan Army.

Mountbatten and Field Marshal Sir Claude Auchinleck, the last Commander-in-Chief, India, had made it clear to Pakistan that in case of war with India, no other member of the Commonwealth would come to Pakistan's aid. The Stand Down Order, which was the title of a general order issued by Field Marshal Claude Auchinleck, the Supreme Commander of the Indian and Pakistani military forces. He had told both governments that in the event of war between the two newly formed dominions, British officers would leave.

=== The Indo-Pakistani War of 1947–48 ===
Sloan contracted an illness which prevented him from coming to Pakistan in August 1947. After his recovery, he arrived in Pakistan and joined the 71st Field Company of Pakistan Army Engineers on 18 October 1947. His services led to him being promoted to major the very next month. It was then that India-Pakistan tensions boiled over, and signalled the start of the Indo-Pakistani war of 1947–1948. India had begun building up its army presence in the Jammu and Kashmir region since late October. In response the Pakistanis rapidly organised their army units and moved them to Kashmir to prevent the Indian invasion.

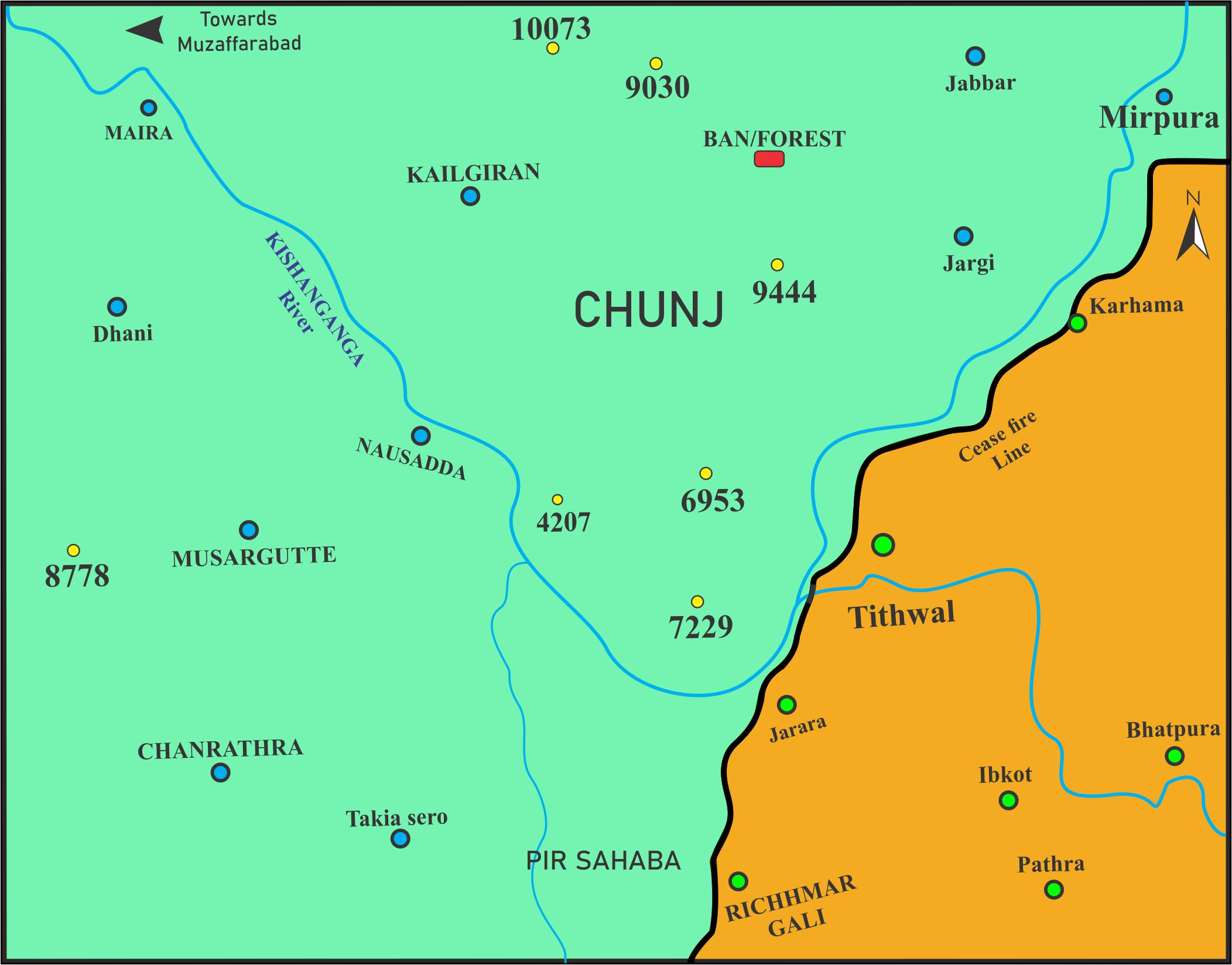
Map of features in the Chunj area

In May 1948, the Indian 163rd Brigade launched an offensive in Tithwal sector which raised the threat to Muzaffarabad after their forces advanced from Handwara to Tithwal and from Uri to Urusa. The advance caused much panic and desperation in the Pakistani high command. The 10th Brigade of the Pakistan Army under Brigadier Haji Iftikhar Ahmad was tasked to stop the Indian advance and defend Muzaffarabad at all costs. The Pakistani high command also considered it necessary to drive the Indian troops from the heights of the Chunj range and push the Indian troops back to the left bank of the Neelum River.

The mountainous terrain of the area made the services of the engineering units of the army more important. At that time, there were only two engineering brigades in the Pakistan Armed Forces, which were the 2nd and 71st Engineering Brigades and were led by Major Tufail Ahmad and Sloan. The Tithwal sector had a strategically important mountain feature called the Chunj feature, consisting of two hills, either of which was important for further advances. The 17th Punjab Regiment was given the task to capture this feature from the Pakistanis. Due to this unexpected advance, the Pakistanis needed artillery support at Point 9444 (the higher of the two hills in the Chunj feature, the other being 7229).

Hence, it was decided to move the QF 3.7-inch mountain howitzer, nicknamed Shehzadi, to Point 9444 after dismantling it for transport, owing to the absence of a paved or proper route. The 71st Engineering Brigade was said to have worked day and night to make the track fit for the artillery piece to be transported by mules. With the help of a sling and pulley, the dismantled gun was pulled across the Kishanganga (Neelum River) at Ghori. Shehzadi was reassembled in two days. After achieving this feat of engineering, the 71st Engineers set to work clearing mines and fixing paths for logistics.

== Death and legacy ==
While leading his soldiers during a mine clearing operation, Sloan fell down a slope and triggered a tripwire which blew up a land mine. He received serious injuries which proved to be fatal on 10 July. Another Pakistani soldier, Lance Naik Aman Khan, was also killed by the blast. Sloan's body was taken to the British Cemetery in Abbottabad and buried there with full military honours. Sloan is the only British soldier to die in action for Pakistan.

In July 1948, London was shocked to be notified that 8 to 12 British officers were on duty in Kashmir. General Bucher wanted to avoid a direct battle with Pakistan and used his sources to halt any step taken by the Indian commander to use these officers. He also made sure that the circumstances under which Sloan died would not made public. Philip Noel-Baker submitted a note to Clement Attlee requesting not to use the Stand Down Order, which would be harmful for Pakistan and would also result in the souring of relations between Britain and Pakistan. Therefore, the request for the Stand Down Order made by Jawaharlal Nehru was turned down.

== See also ==
- Karam Singh
- Battle of Pandu
- Pakistan Army Corps of Engineers
- Military history of Pakistan

== Sources ==
=== Works cited ===
- Ali, Ahmad (2022). "Major Sloan in Kashmir (Story of a British officer Serving with the Pakistan Army, Killed in Action during the Kashmir Liberation War, 1947–48)". Bugle & Trumpet. Summer 2023 (IV). Archived from the original on 18 July 2024 – via Aimh.gov.pk (Army Institute of Military History).
- Lamb, Alastair (1997), Incomplete Partition: The Genesis of the Kashmir Dispute, 1947–1948, Roxford Books, ISBN 0-907129-08-0
- Muqeem Khan, Fazal (1963), The Story of the Pakistan Army, Pakistan Branch, Oxford University Press
- Nigel, Kelly (2010). The History and Culture of Pakistan. Peak Publishing. ISBN 978-1-901458-67-1.
- Rakesh, Ankit (2016). The Kashmir Conflict From Empire to the Cold War, 1945–66. Taylor & Francis. ISBN 9781317225256.
- Saraf, Muhammad Yusuf (2015) [first published 1979 by Ferozsons]. Kashmiris Fight for Freedom, Volume 2. Mirpur: National Institute Kashmir Studies. Archived from the original on 29 March 2021.
- Shahbaz, Muhammad (September 2018). "Kashmir–1948 4/16 Punjab Regiment Chunj Operation" (PDF). Defence Journal. 22 (2): 59–69.
- Sinha, S. K. (1977). Operation Rescue Military Operations in Jammu & Kashmir, 1947–49. Vision Books. Archived from the original on 20 January 2021.
