= Karam Singh =

Indian soldier and war hero (1915–1993)

Subedar and Honorary Captain Karam Singh PVC, MM
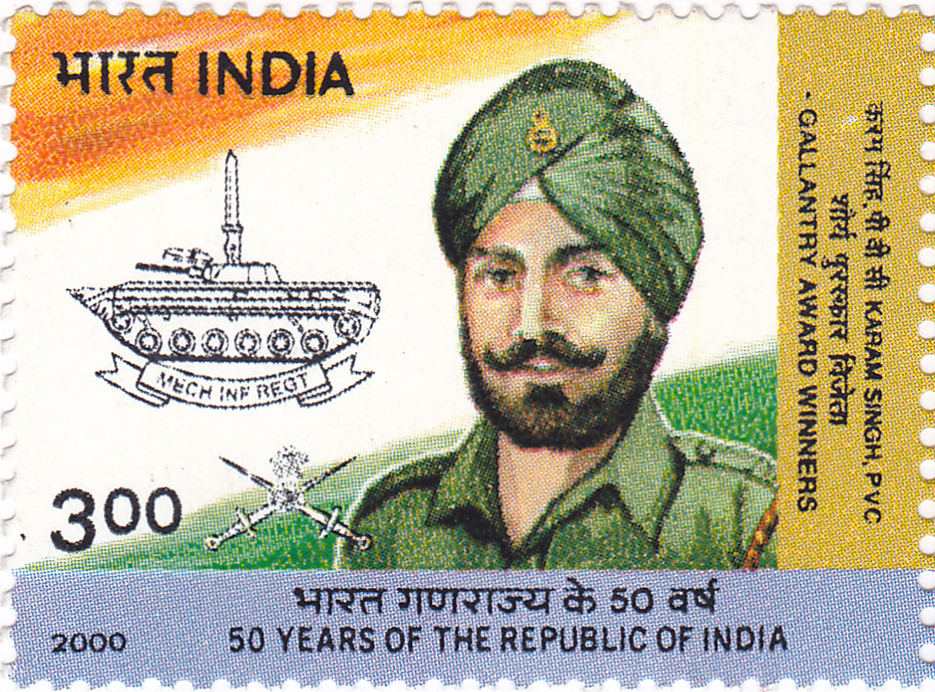
- Singh 2000 on a stamp of India
- Born: 15 September 1915; Sehna, Barnala, Punjab, British India
- Died: 20 January 1993 (aged 77); Sehna, Barnala, Punjab, India
- Military career
- Allegiance: British India; India
- Branch: British Indian Army; Indian Army
- Service years: 1941–1969
- Rank: Subedar Honorary Captain
- Service number: 22356 (enlisted); JC-6415 (junior commissioned officer)
- Unit: 1st Battalion (1 Sikh)
- Conflicts: Second World War; Burma Campaign; Battle of the Admin Box; Indo-Pakistani War of 1947
- Awards: Param Vir Chakra; Military Medal

Subedar and Honorary Captain Karam Singh, PVC, MM (15 September 1915 – 20 January 1993) was an Indian soldier and a recipient of the Param Vir Chakra (PVC), India's highest award for gallantry. Singh joined the army in 1941, and took part in the Burma Campaign of World War II, receiving the Military Medal for his actions during the Battle of the Admin Box in 1944. He also fought in the Indo-Pakistani War of 1947, and was awarded the PVC for his role in saving a forward post at Richhmar Gali, south of Tithwal. He was also one of the five soldiers chosen to raise the Indian flag for the first time after independence in 1947. Singh later rose to the rank of subedar, and was conferred the rank of honorary captain before his retirement in September 1969.

== Early life ==
Karam Singh was born on 15 September 1915 in the village of Sehna, Barnala district, in Punjab, British India in a tarkhan Sikh family. His father, Uttam Singh, was a farmer. Singh also intended to become a farmer, but he decided to join the army after being inspired by the stories of First World War veterans from his village. After completing his primary schooling in his village, in 1941, he joined the Army.

== Military career ==
On 15 September 1941, he enrolled in the 1st battalion of the Sikh Regiment. For his conduct and courage in the Battle of the Admin Box during the Burma Campaign of World War II, he was awarded the Military Medal. As a young, war-decorated sepoy, he earned respect from fellow soldiers in his battalion. He was one of the five soldiers selected by then Prime Minister Jawaharlal Nehru to raise the Indian flag for the first time after independence in 1947.

=== War of 1947 ===
In the aftermath of the independence of India in 1947, India and Pakistan fought over the princely state of Kashmir for a brief period. During the initial stages of the conflict, Pakistan's Pashtun tribal militias crossed the border of the state, occupying several villages, including Tithwal. That village, being on the Line of Control in the Kupwara Sector, was a strategically important point for India.

On 23 May 1948, the Indian Army captured Tithwal from Pakistan troops, but the Pakistanis quickly launched a counter-attack to recapture the area. The Indian troops, unable to withstand the attack, withdrew from their positions to the Tithwal ridge, preparing to regain their positions at the right moment.

As the battle at Tithwal continued for months, the Pakistanis grew desperate and launched a massive attack on 13 October, hoping to drive the Indians from their positions. Their primary objective was to capture the Richhmar Gali, located south of Tithwal, and the Nastachur Pass, east of Tithwal. During the fierce battle on the night of 13 October at Richhmar Gali, Lance Naik (Note: Lance naik is equivalent to lance corporal.) Singh was commanding a 1 SIKH forward post.

Although outnumbered ten-to-one by the Pakistani troops, the Sikhs repelled their attacks multiple times. With their ammunition running out, Singh ordered his men to join the main company, knowing that reinforcement was impossible under Pakistani shelling. With the help of another soldier, he brought two injured men along, though he himself was wounded. Under the heavy Pakistani fire, Singh moved from position to position, boosting the morale of his men and intermittently throwing grenades. Despite being wounded twice on both the hands, he refused evacuation and continued to hold the first line of trenches.

During the fifth wave of attacks, two Pakistani soldiers closed on Singh's position; Singh jumped out of his trench and killed them with his bayonet. Singh and his men then successfully repelled three more enemy attacks before the Pakistani troops finally retreated, unable to capture their position.

=== Param Vir Chakra ===
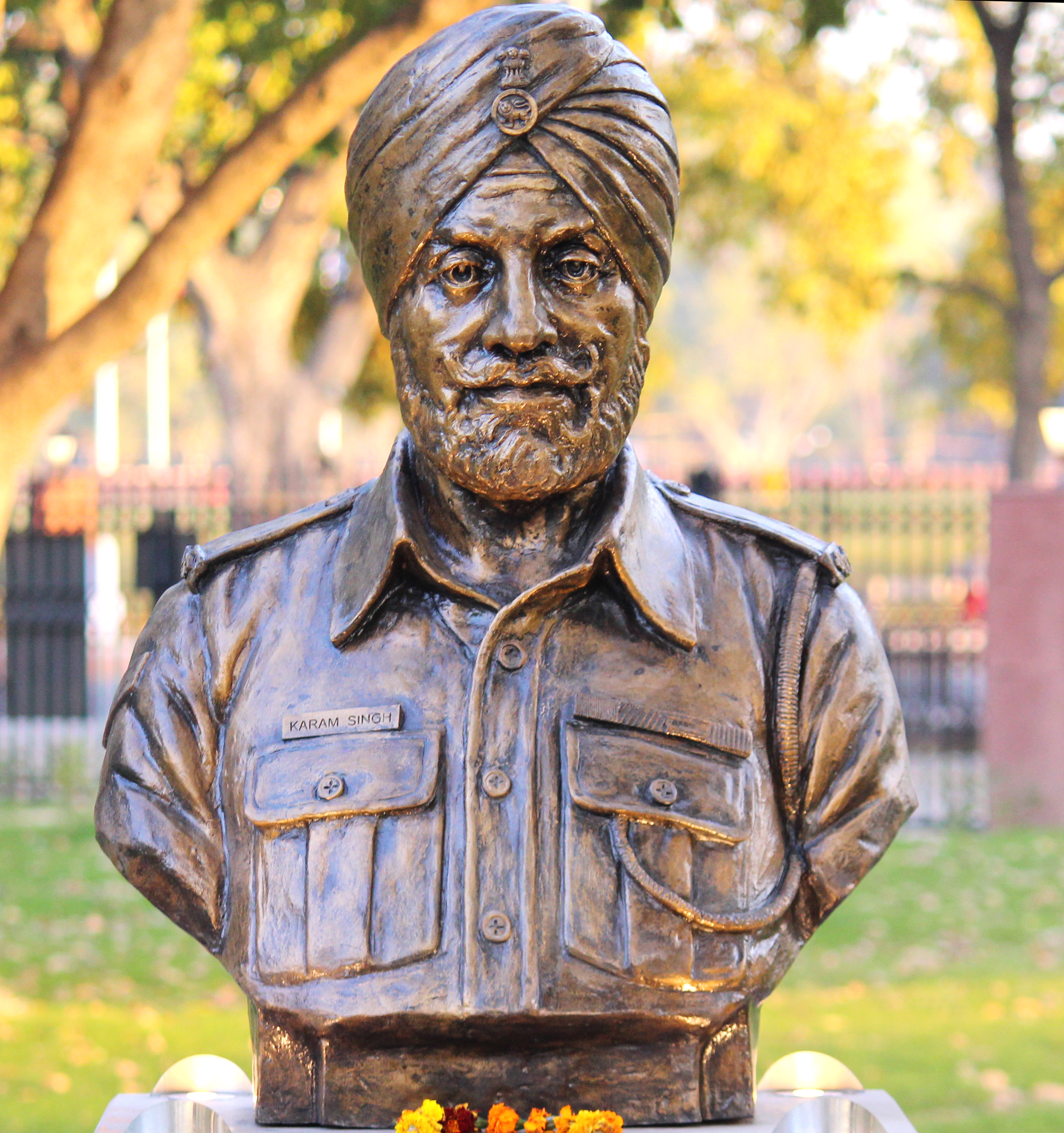
Singh's statue at Param Yodha Sthal, National War Memorial, New Delhi

On 21 June 1950, Singh's award of the Param Vir Chakra was gazetted. The citation read:

Tithwal in Jammu and Kashmir was captured on 23 May 1948. After that date, the enemy made numerous attempts to recapture Richmar Gali, and thence Tithwal. On 13 October 1948, coinciding with Eid al-Adha, the enemy decided to launch a brigade attack to retake Richmar Gali, and bypassing Tithwal, advance into the Srinagar Valley. Lance Naik Karam Singh was commanding a section at Richmar Gali. The enemy commenced its attack with heavy shelling of guns and mortars. The fire was so accurate that not a single bunker in the platoon locality was left unscathed. Communication trenches caved in. Bravely, Lance Naik Karam Singh went from bunker to bunker, giving succor to the wounded and urging the men to fight. The enemy launched eight separate attacks that day. In one such attack, the enemy managed to obtain a foothold in the platoon locality. Immediately, Lance Naik Karam Singh, who was severely wounded by then, with a few men, hurled himself in a counter-attack and evicted the enemy after a close quarter encounter which accounted for many enemy dead, having been dispatched by the bayonet. Lance Naik Karam Singh proved himself to be a dauntless leader of men in crisis. Nothing could subdue him and no amount of fire or hardship could break his spirit.

— Gazette Notification: 2 Pres/50, 21.6.50,

On 10 January 1957, now a havildar (sergeant), Singh was promoted to the junior commissioned officer (JCO) rank of jemadar (later redesignated naib subedar) with the service number of JC-6415. He was promoted to subedar on 1 March 1964, and was later promoted to subedar-major. On 26 January 1969, he received an honorary commission in the rank of captain. Singh retired in September 1969. He was one of the five soldiers selected by then Prime Minister Jawaharlal Nehru to raise the Indian flag for the first time after independence in 1947.

== Honours and awards ==
The following are the medals awarded to Subedar Major and Honorary Captain Karam Singh during his service in the Indian and British Indian Army as per available public domain records.

=== Military awards ===

Param Vir Chakra		Parakram Padak	
General Service Medal	Samar Seva Star	India Independence Medal	Military Medal
1939–1945 Star	Burma Star	War Medal 1939–1945	India Service Medal 1939–1945

== Later life ==
Singh died on 20 January 1993 in his village, and was survived by his wife, Gurdial Kaur, and children.

== Other honours ==
In the 1980s, the Shipping Corporation of India (SCI), a Government of India enterprise under the aegis of the Ministry of Shipping, named fifteen of its crude oil tankers in honour of the PVC recipients. The tanker MT Lance Naik Karam Singh, PVC was delivered to SCI on 30 July 1984, and served for 25 years before being phased out. The government also built a memorial in his honour at the District Administrative Complex in Sangrur.

== Notes ==
Footnotes

Citations
