= Ghulam Rasul Raja =

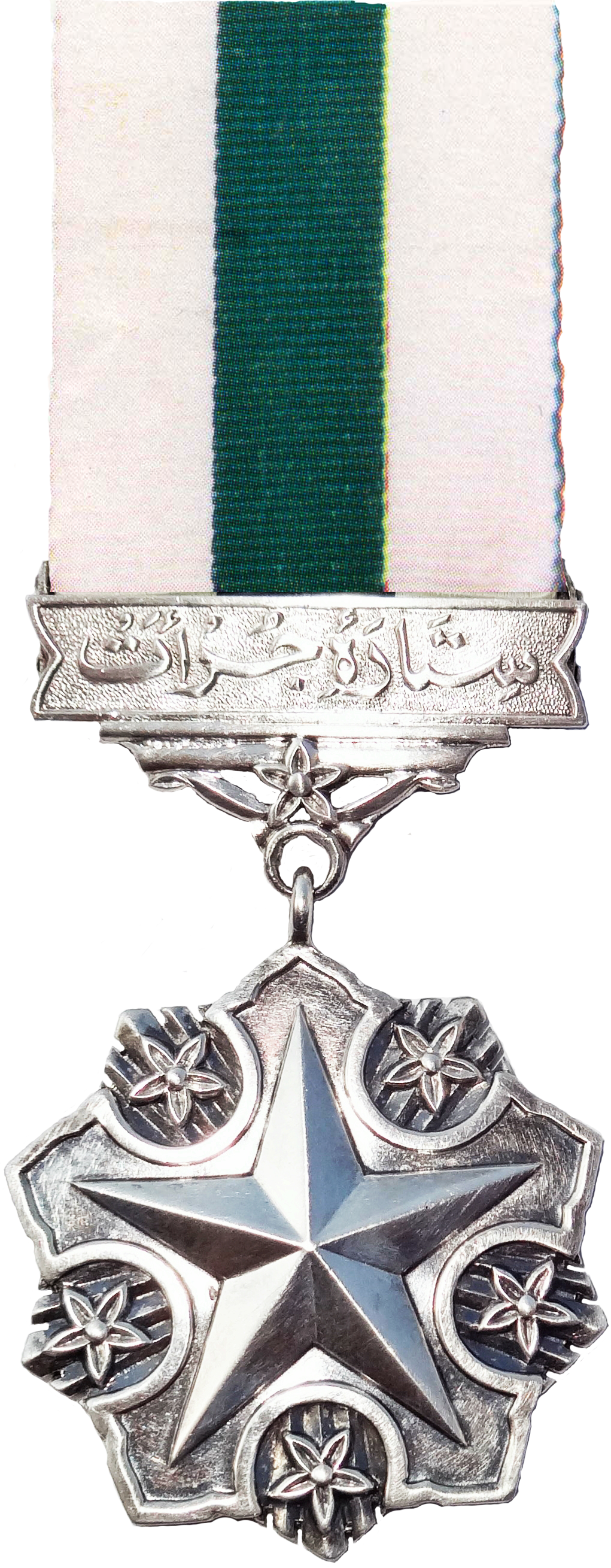
Lieutenant Colonel Ghulam Rasul Raja Sitara-e-Jurat SJ MC

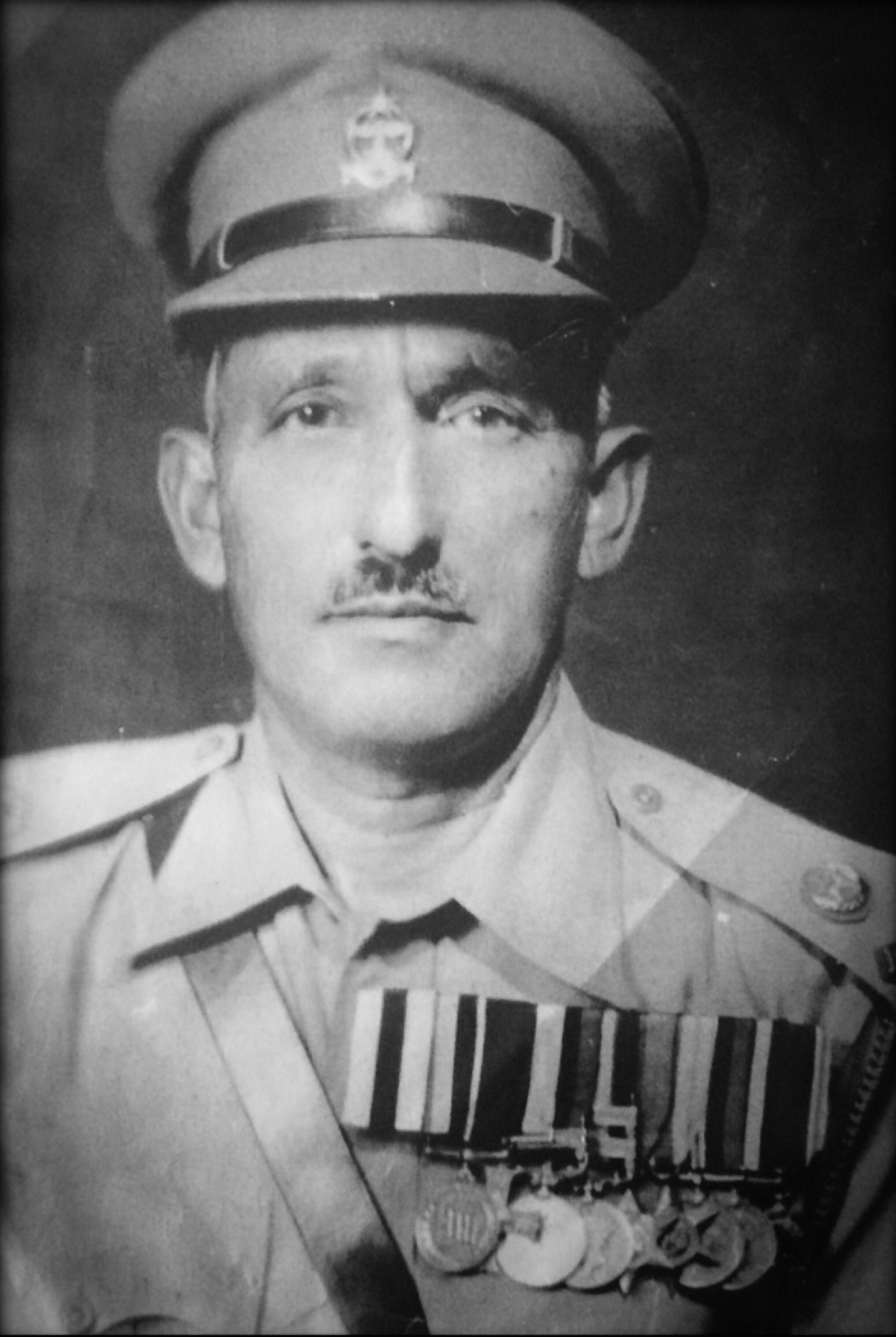
- Lt Col Ghulam Rasul Raja
- Born: Panjeri, Jammu and Kashmir (Present day Azad Kashmir, Pakistan)
- Died: Sarai Alamgir, Punjab, Pakistan
- Burial place: Sarai Alamgir, Pakistan
- Military career
- Allegiance: United Kingdom; Pakistan
- Branch: British Indian Army; Pakistan Army
- Service years: 1923–1948
- Rank: Lieutenant Colonel
- Unit: 16th Punjab Regiment
- Conflicts: World War II; Indo-Pakistani War of 1947; Indonesian National Revolution
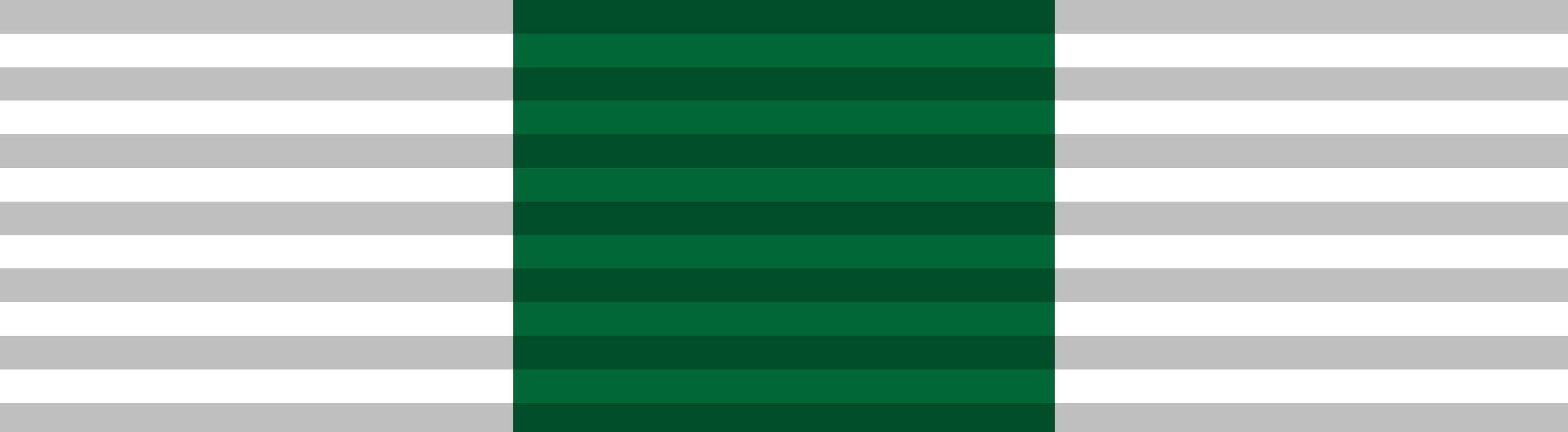
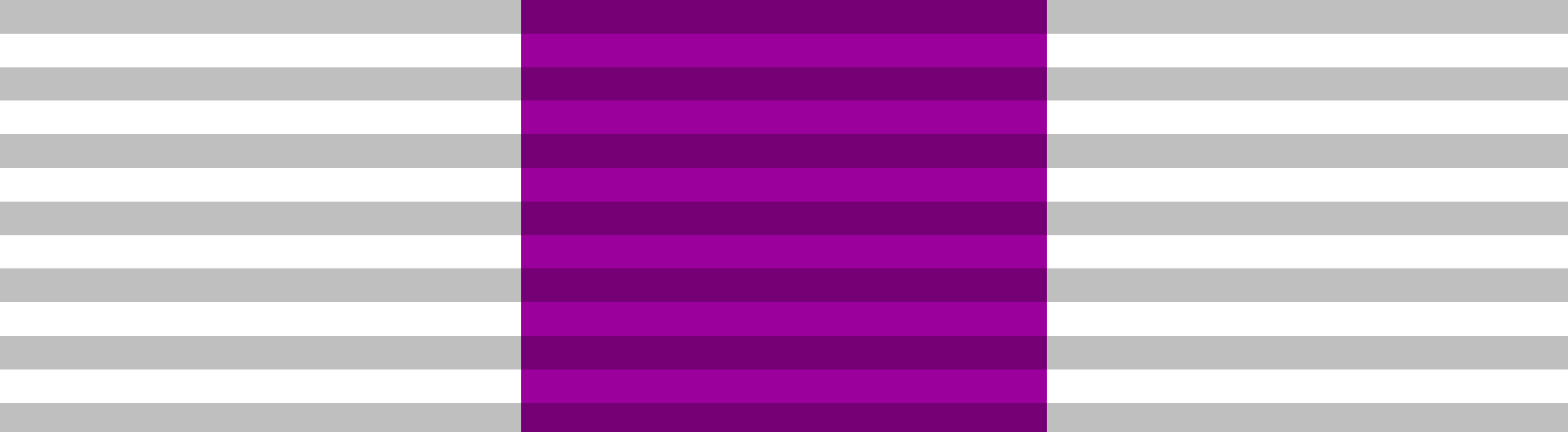
- Awards: Sitara-e-Jurat Military Cross

Lieutenant Colonel Ghulam Rasul Raja SJ MC was an army officer of the British Indian Army and later of the Pakistan Army who served in the 16th Punjab regiment under the British Raj. He later served Pakistan when the regiment was ceded to the Pakistan. He was from Panjeri (Azad Kashmir) and settled in Sarai Alamgir (Punjab, Pakistan).

== Early military service ==
Ghulam Rasul enlisted in the 4th battalion 16th Punjab Regiment on 9 June 1923. He received a Viceroy's commission as a Jemadar on 1 September 1937 and was promoted Subedar 15 July 1939. Before the Second World War, he had served extensively on the northwest Frontier of India, taking part in the northwest Frontier 1930–31, Mohmand 1935 and Waziristan 1936-37 campaigns.

The battalion went overseas in October 1940. It served in Egypt, the Sudan, and Eritrea before moving back to the Western Desert of Egypt in April 1941.

== Military Cross (WW2) ==
In early November 1941, the 4th battalion 16th Punjab Regiment moved to camp east of Sidi Barrani and undertook training in preparation of their part of Operation Crusader. On the evening of 18 November, they formed up at Bir Deheusa, 5 miles northwest of the heavily defended Omar position. The main attack on the Omars took place at 1200 hours on 22 November, with the battle for Omar Nuovo. When the word came in this attack had been successful the 4/16th were to advance on the Libyan Omar position. This they did, with Subedar Ghulam Rasul leading "D" company on the left. As a result of this action, he was awarded the MC in the London Gazette 23 January 1942.

Libya was strategically important for the British because the amassing of a large Italian army at Tripolitania and Cyrenaica threatened the Suez Canal and Alexandria.

Ghulam Rasul received an Indian Emergency Commission into the Indian Army and the 16th Punjab Regiment as a Second Lieutenant on 9 July 1942 and was made war substantive Lieutenant the same date.

== Sitara-e-Jurrat (1947–1948 Kashmir War) ==
Raja was again at the forefront of the offensive. In this particular instance, he was involved in pushing the Indian armed forces out of Kashmir as the first struggle for Pakistan to take Kashmir began in 1947. Pakistan roughly gained 2/5 of Kashmir in this war, although the outcome was a UN Intervention ceasefire, it is seen as a victory from the Pakistani perspective. Raja was stationed in front of a peak which was held by the Indian forces. Numerous Pakistani soldiers had been killed by fire from the higher ground due to the elevated Indian position. Raja realised that the Indian's had a great strategic advantage and thus a plan must be devised to advance further. His unit tried to concentrate artillery fire on the Indian stronghold but did not succeed. Thus he ordered the artillery units to be elevated to higher positions, trying best to keep this hidden from enemy view.

Raja and his men monitored Indian movement for a number of days in order to find gaps in their guard and times when their defences were weak. He was thus able to devise a strategically timed offensive. He asked men to come forward to aid him in the apex of the ambush, with complete awareness that it was almost certainly a fatal mission since the Indian forces heavily outnumbered the Pakistani force at that position. They prepared for the offensive, waiting for the Indian defence to weaken, they attacked with aid of the artillery that had been repositioned. The Indians were stunned at the scale of the attack and fell immediately under the pretense that a large Pakistani force had arrived. They surrendered and subsequently, the peak had been liberated by Pakistani forces. For his exemplary bravery, he was awarded the honor of Sitara-e-Jurrat (Star of Courage).

He later went on to found the 9th Azad Kashmir Battalion, to whom he became a symbol of valor. He is remembered on their various commemorative meetings.

== Awards and decorations ==
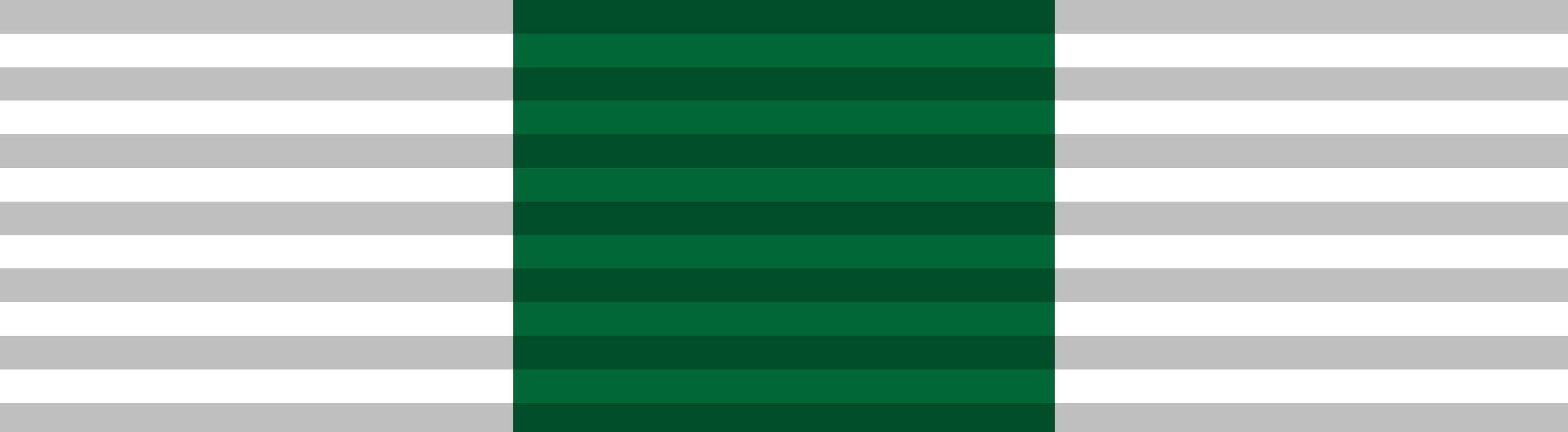

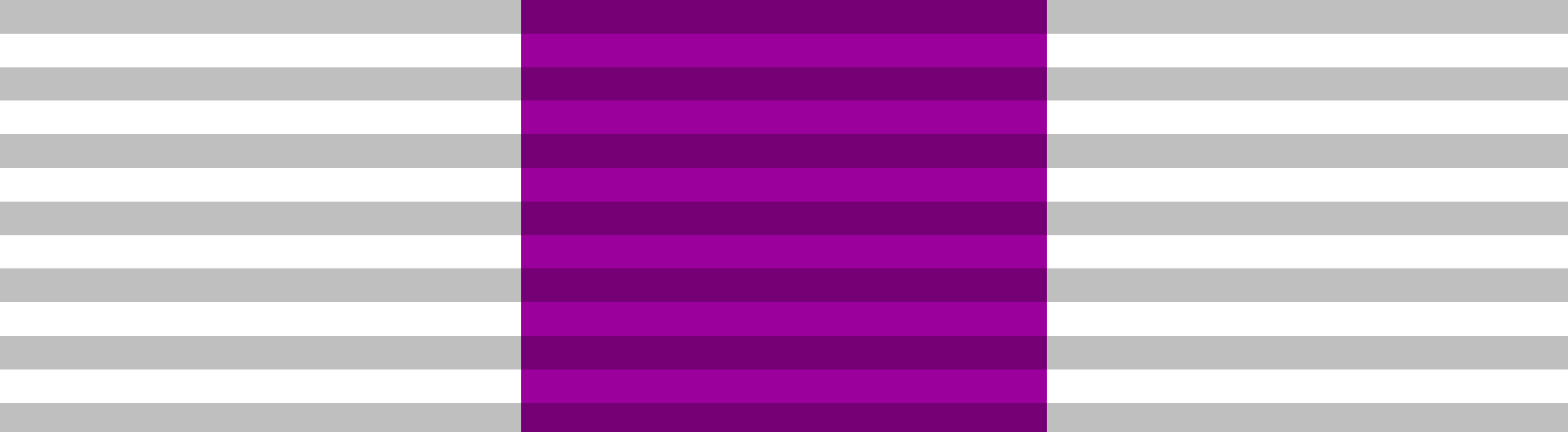

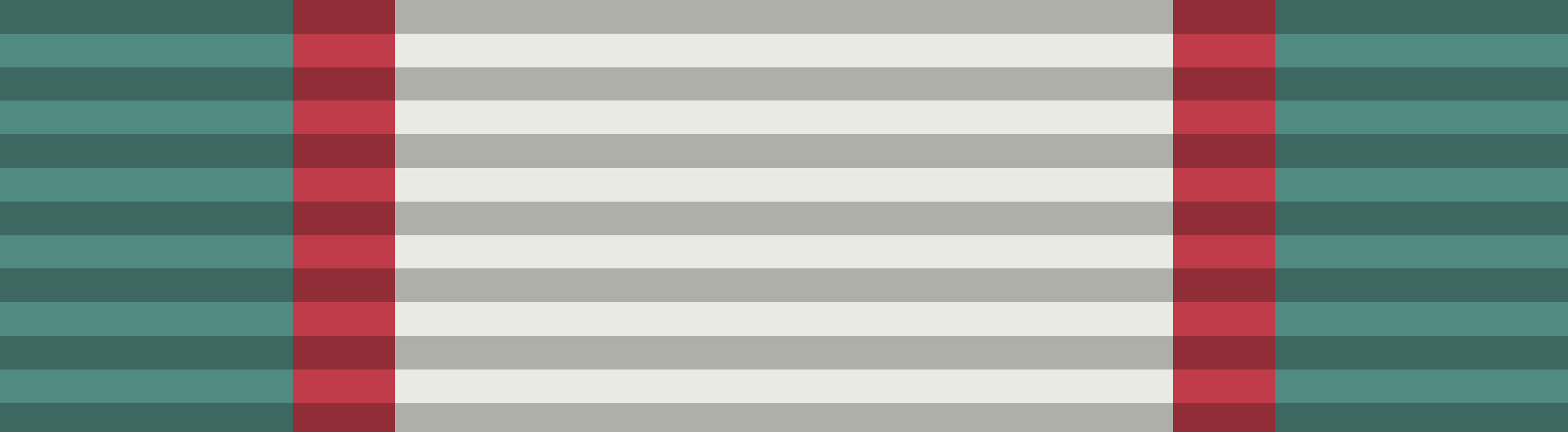

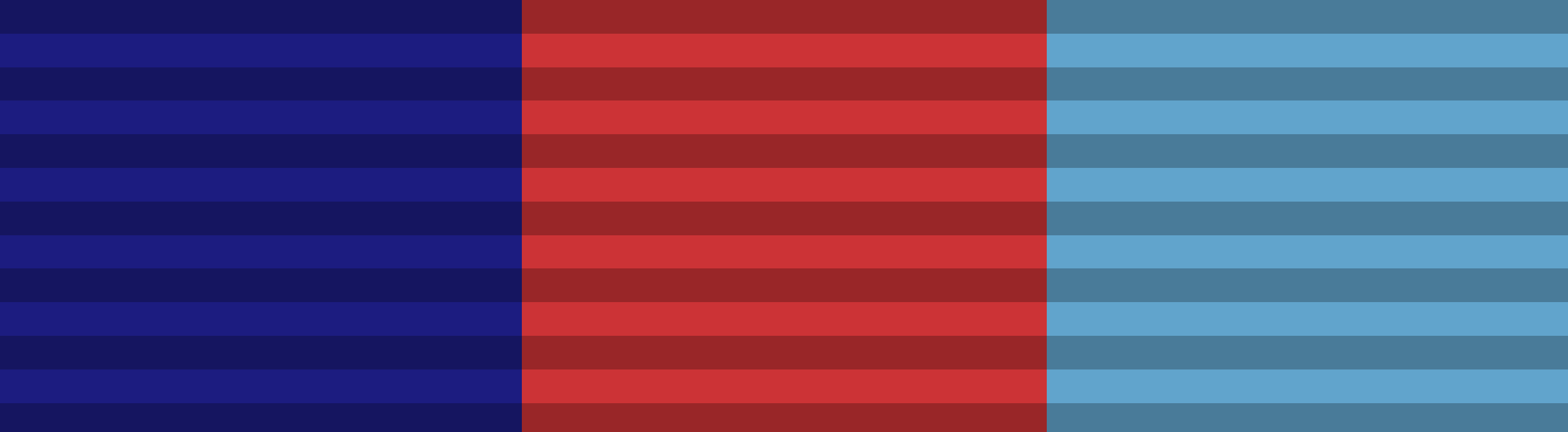

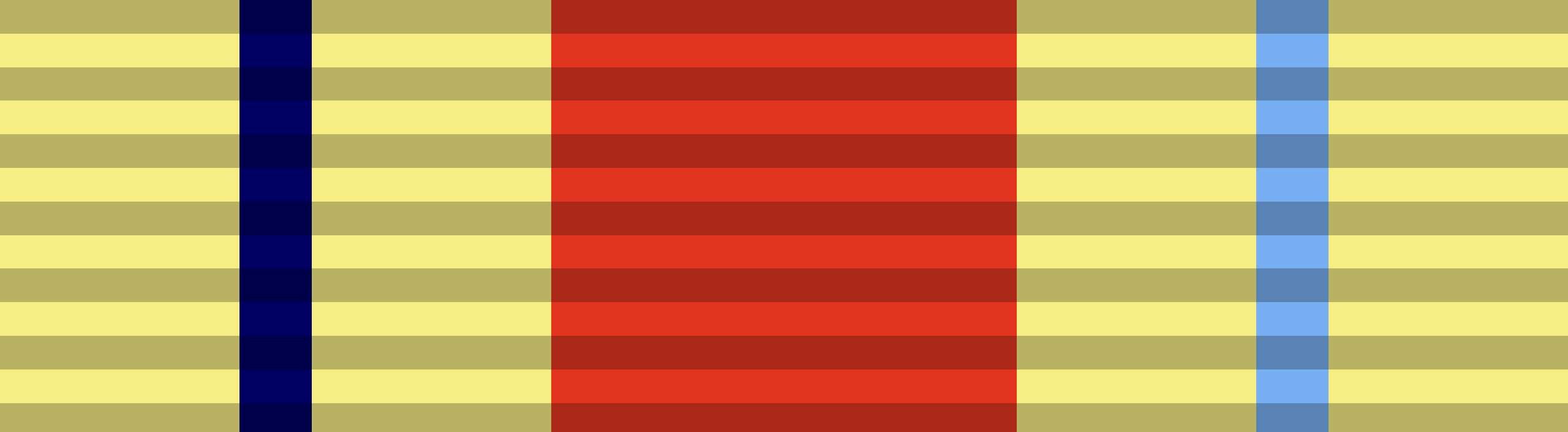

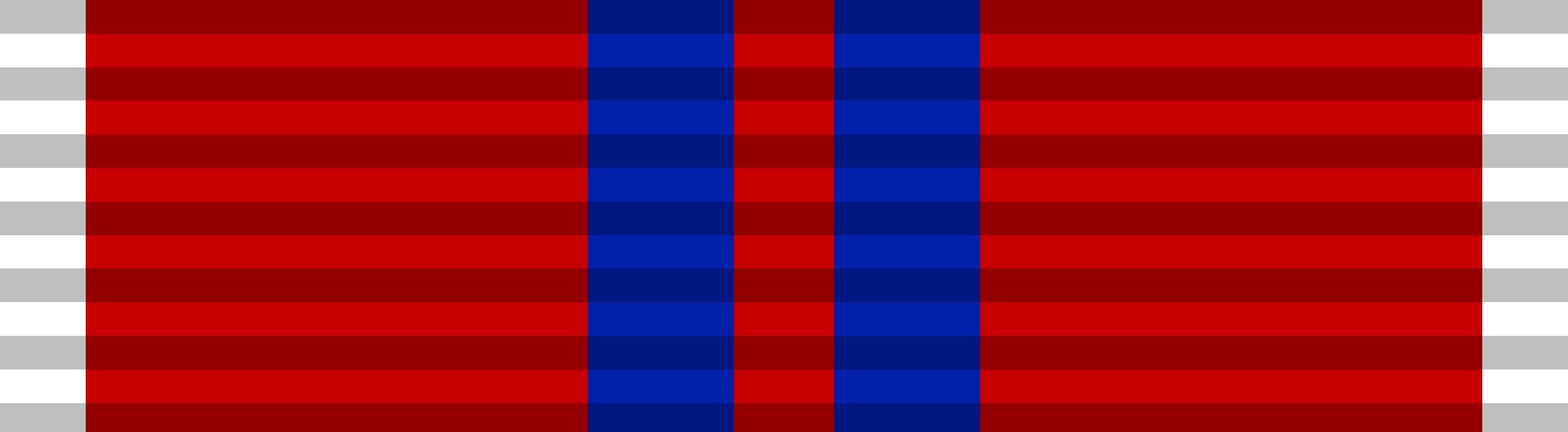

	Sitara-e-Jurat (Star of Courage) Kashmir 1948 War		
Tamgha-e-Diffa (General Service Medal): 1. Kashmir 1948 Clasp	Pakistan Tamgha (Pakistan Medal)	Tamgha-e-Jamhuria (Republic Commemoration Medal) 1956	Military Cross (MC)(awarded for GALLANTRY in Africa 1942)
India General Service Medal (1909) Mohmand 1935 Clasp	India General Service Medal (1936): 1. North West Frontier 1936–37 Clasp; 2. North West Frontier 1937–39 Clasp	1939-1945 Star	Africa Star
War Medal 1939-1945	India Service Medal 1939–1945	Queen Elizabeth II Coronation Medal (1953)	King George VI Coronation Medal (1937)

=== Foreign Decorations ===
Foreign Awards
UK	Military Cross (MC)
UK	India General Service Medal (1909)
UK	India General Service Medal (1936)
UK	1939-1945 Star
UK	Africa Star
UK	War Medal 1939-1945
UK	India Service Medal 1939–1945
UK	Queen Elizabeth II Coronation Medal
	King George VI Coronation Medal

== See also ==
- Rao Farman Ali
- Alan Macfarlane Sloan
- Battle of Chunj
- 16th Punjab Regiment
- Indonesian National Revolution
