= Keran, Jammu and Kashmir =

Keran
- Village
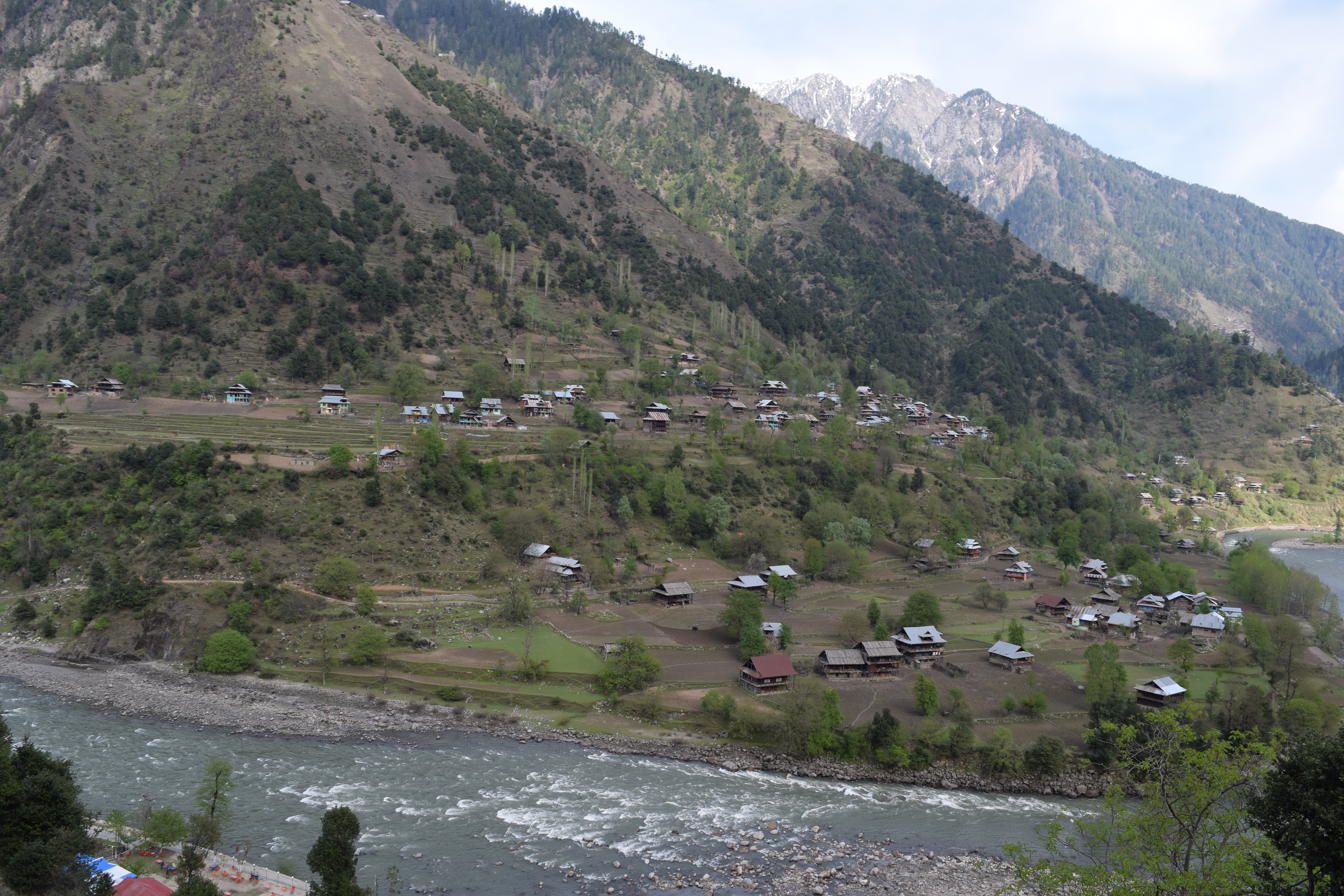
- Keran in Jammu and Kashmir, as seen from the opposite side of the LOC

- Location in Jammu and Kashmir, India Keran (India)
- Coordinates: 34.6505°N 73.9507°E
- Country: India
- Union Territory: Jammu and Kashmir
- District: Kupwara
- Block: Keran
- Demonym(s): Kerani, Keranwala,

Language
  - Local: Pahari ,Kashmiri ,Gojri
- Time zone: UTC+5:30 (IST)
- Postal Index Number: 193224
- Website: kupwara.nic.in

Keran is a tehsil in Kupwara district of Indian-administered Jammu and Kashmir, a region disputed between India and Pakistan. It lies on the banks of the Kishanganga River. Keran block consists four panchayats: Keran, Mandian, Mandian-A, and Kundian-Patroo.

It's roughly 65 Km from district headquarters Kupwara. The Keran- Kupwara highway is a scenic road for Kashmir Valley passing through Pharkian/Farkiyan Pass, which stands at an altitude of ~10,000 ft. On the way to Keran, one can find places like Pujibagh, Pathra, and Murree.

The Kishanganga river (known by the name Neelum river in Pakistan-administered Azad Jammu and Kashmir (AJK)) acts as a natural border between the two villages of Keran, both sides sharing the name. Both sides share similar language, culture, and religion and are believed to have some blood ties as the area was a single unit prior to 1947.

Keran valley is surrounded by dense lush green forests and scenic mountains. The valley is known for rare medicinal plants and herbs which are highly valued in the pharmaceutical industry. There are clear springs scattered all over the valley.

Following the reaffirmation of the ceasefire agreement between India and Pakistan in 2021, the village opened to tourists for the first time, offering a new view of Pakistan-administered Kashmir. Apart from the Kishanganga view, there are some other places like Medh Behak, Bariyan, Sarangali,Chatyaldunga Behak, and Rewadi Behak.

== History ==
The village is believed to have been established by Raja Karn in the 10th century. Legend has it that Raja Karn in 10th century wandered the area in the quest of water from a particular stream to regain his eyesight on the instructions of some mystic saint. His Wazir found the stream in Shardi (Sharda now in Pakistan-administered Azad Jammu and Kashmir (AJK)), and the Raja had a bath in the stream. After regaining his eyesight, he decided to settle in this beautiful valley and thus founded the Keran town. In 1990, the Indian Army relocated the villagers due to frequent firing and shelling by the Pakistan Army. A flood in 1992 destroyed much of the cultivated land. Since the recent cease-fire accords between the governments, the valley has experienced relative peace along the border. With the opening of the border to tourism in 2012, Keran has become a favoured destination for tourists. 2023 saw the highest number of tourists visiting the Keran Valley. One of the reasons for this is the introduction of e-permissions for non-resident tourists.

== See also ==
- Gurez
- Gulmarg
- Sonamarg
- Teetwal
