= Chakothi =

Village on borderline of India and Pakistan

Chakothi چکوٹھی
- Village
- Location within Pakistan Location within Azad Kashmir
- Coordinates: 34.1171°N 73.8831°E
- Country: Pakistan
- State: Azad Kashmir
- District: Hattian Bala
- Time zone: PST

Chakothi (Urdu: چکوٹھی; Urdu pronunciation: [tʃəkoːʈʰiː]) is a village on the borderline of Pakistan and India, in the Hattian Bala District of Azad Kashmir. It is located 52 kilometers (32 mi) from Muzaffarabad, near the Line of Control on the banks of the Jhelum River. Chakothi is the check post to Muzaffarabad-Srinagar bus service for immigration and customs.

On his visit to Pakistan in 2022, Secretary General of Organisation of Islamic Cooperation (OIC) Hissein Brahim Taha visited the Chakothi sector.

== Gallery ==
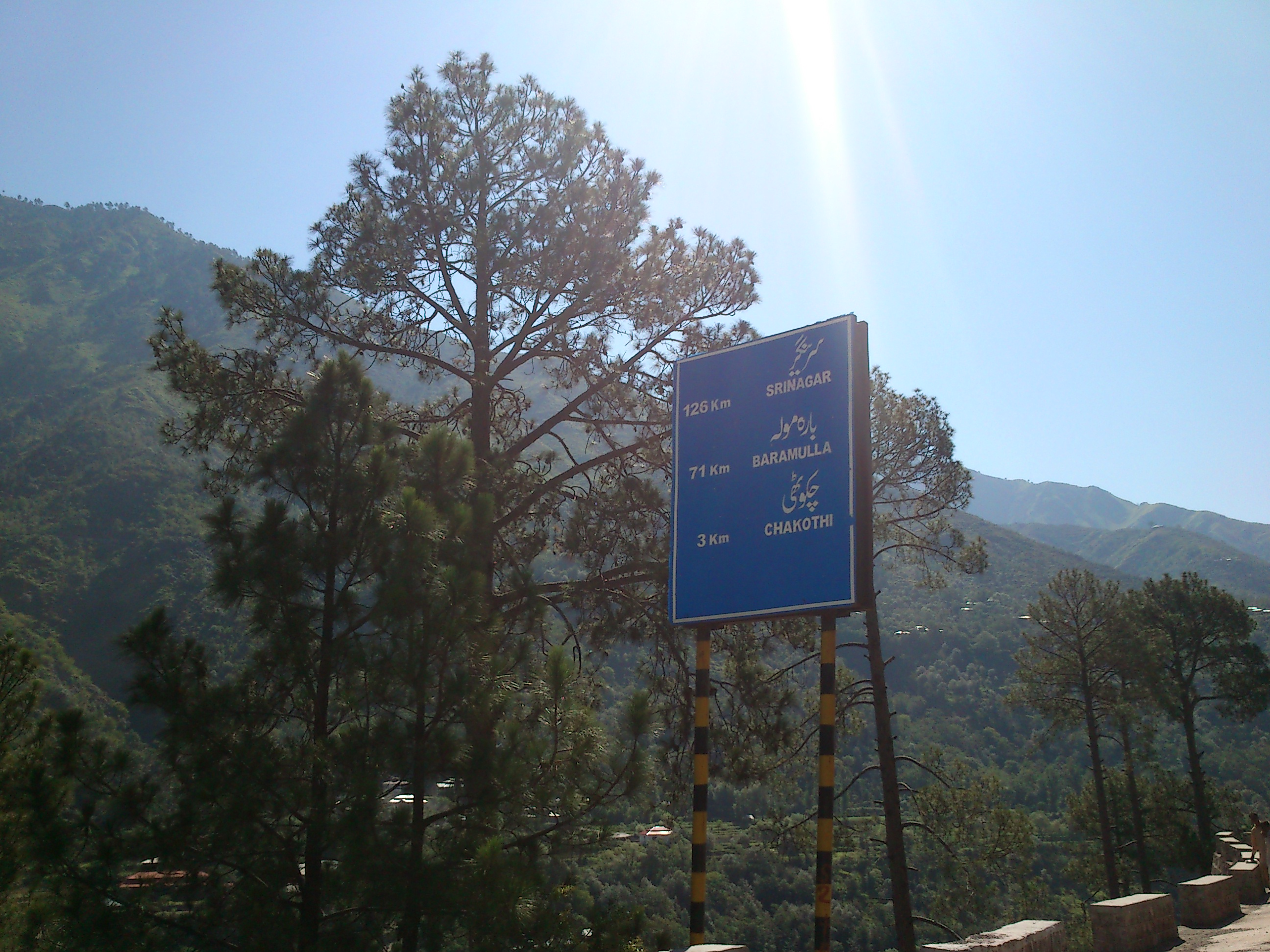
Road to Chakothi

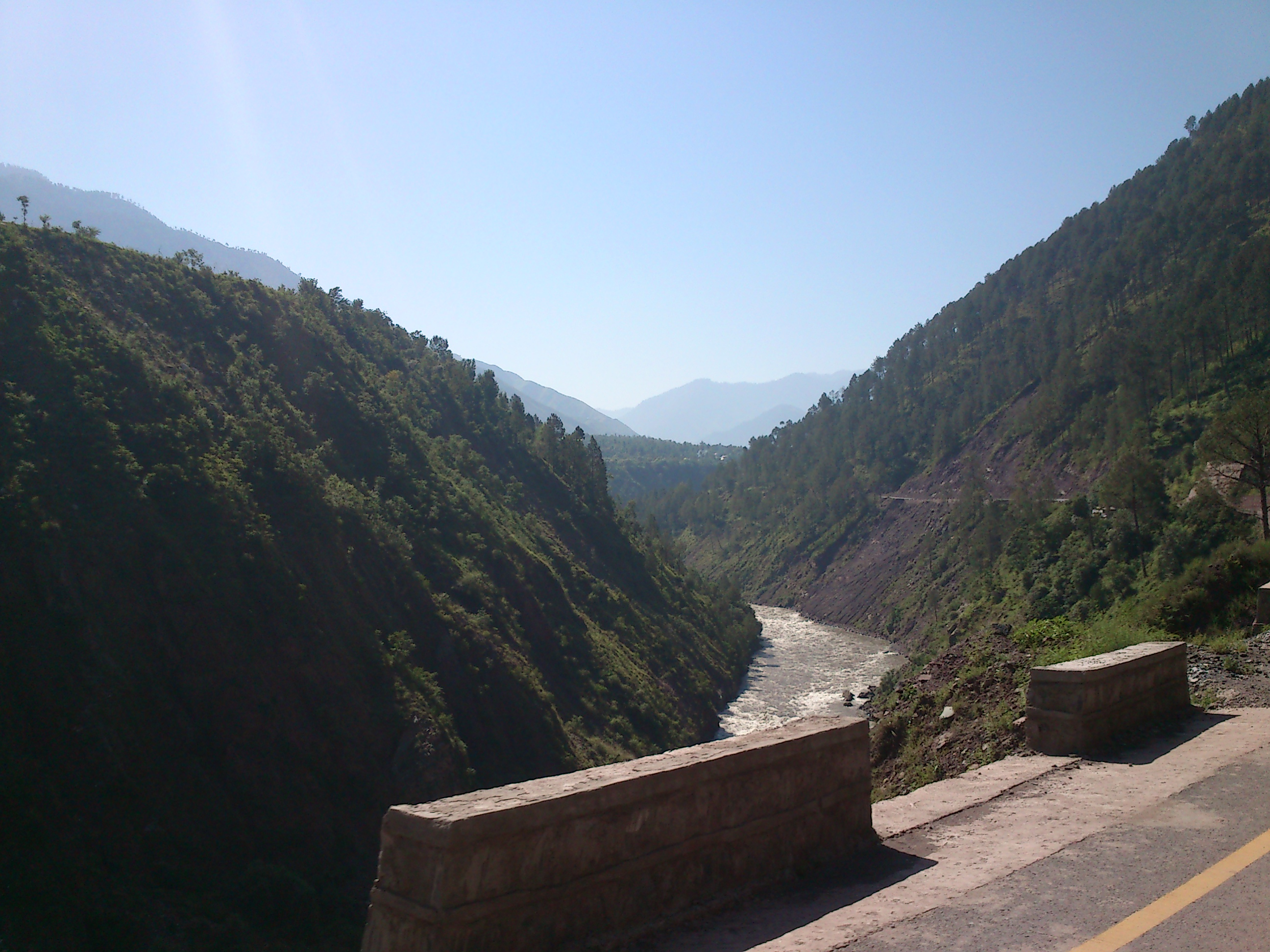
River Jhelum near Chakothi

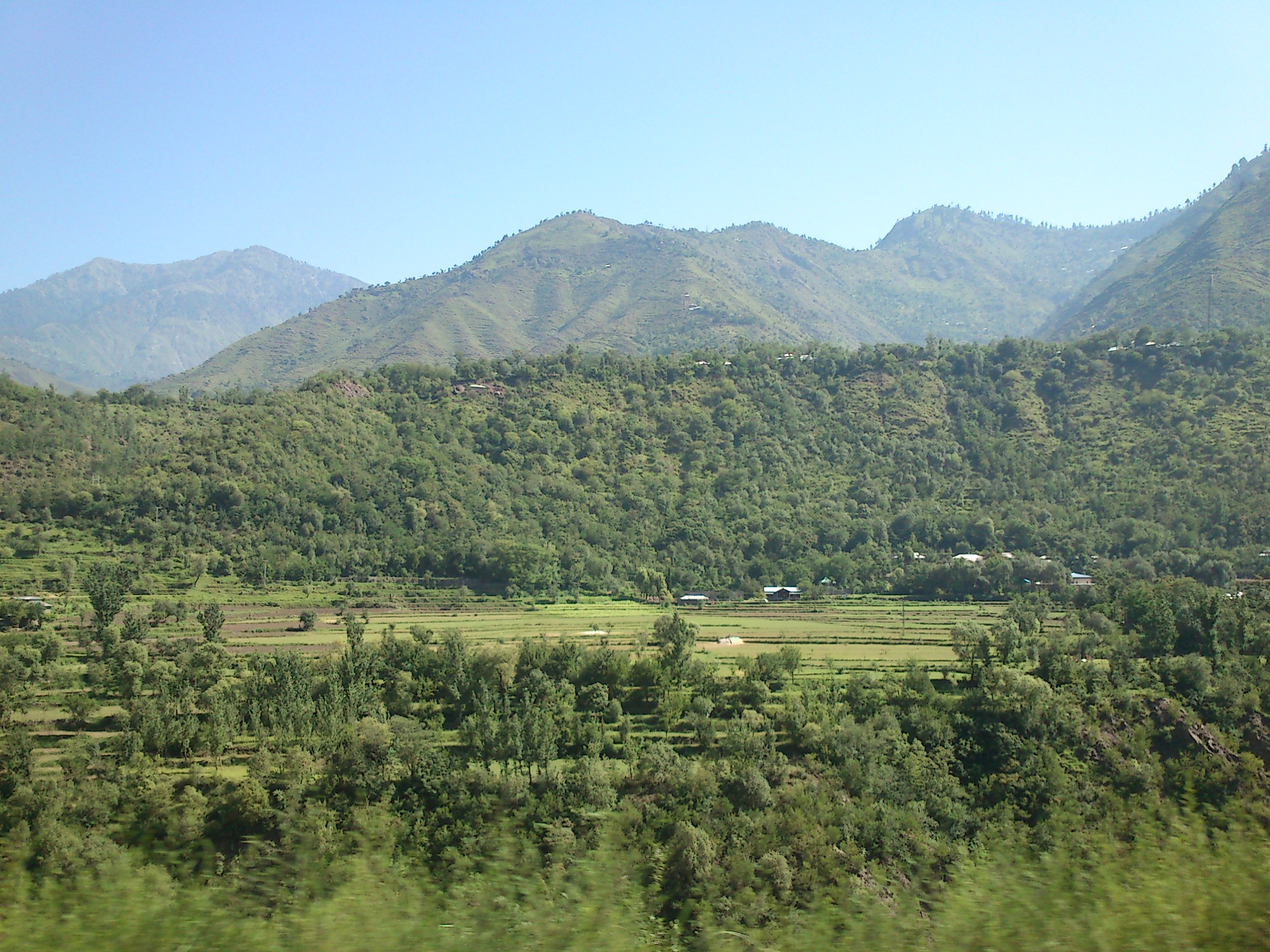
Fields across river Jhelum near Chakothi

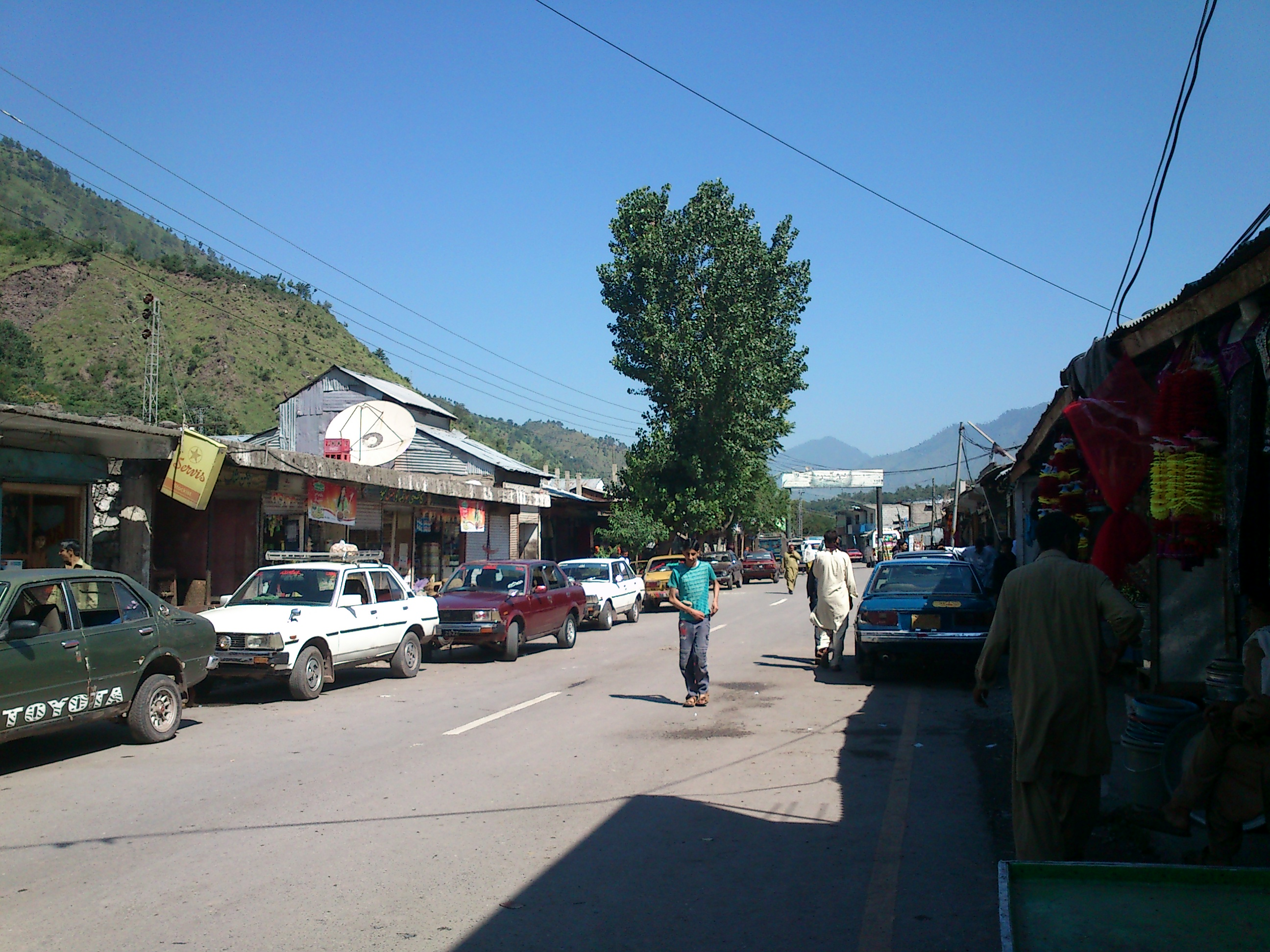
Main Bazar, Chakothi

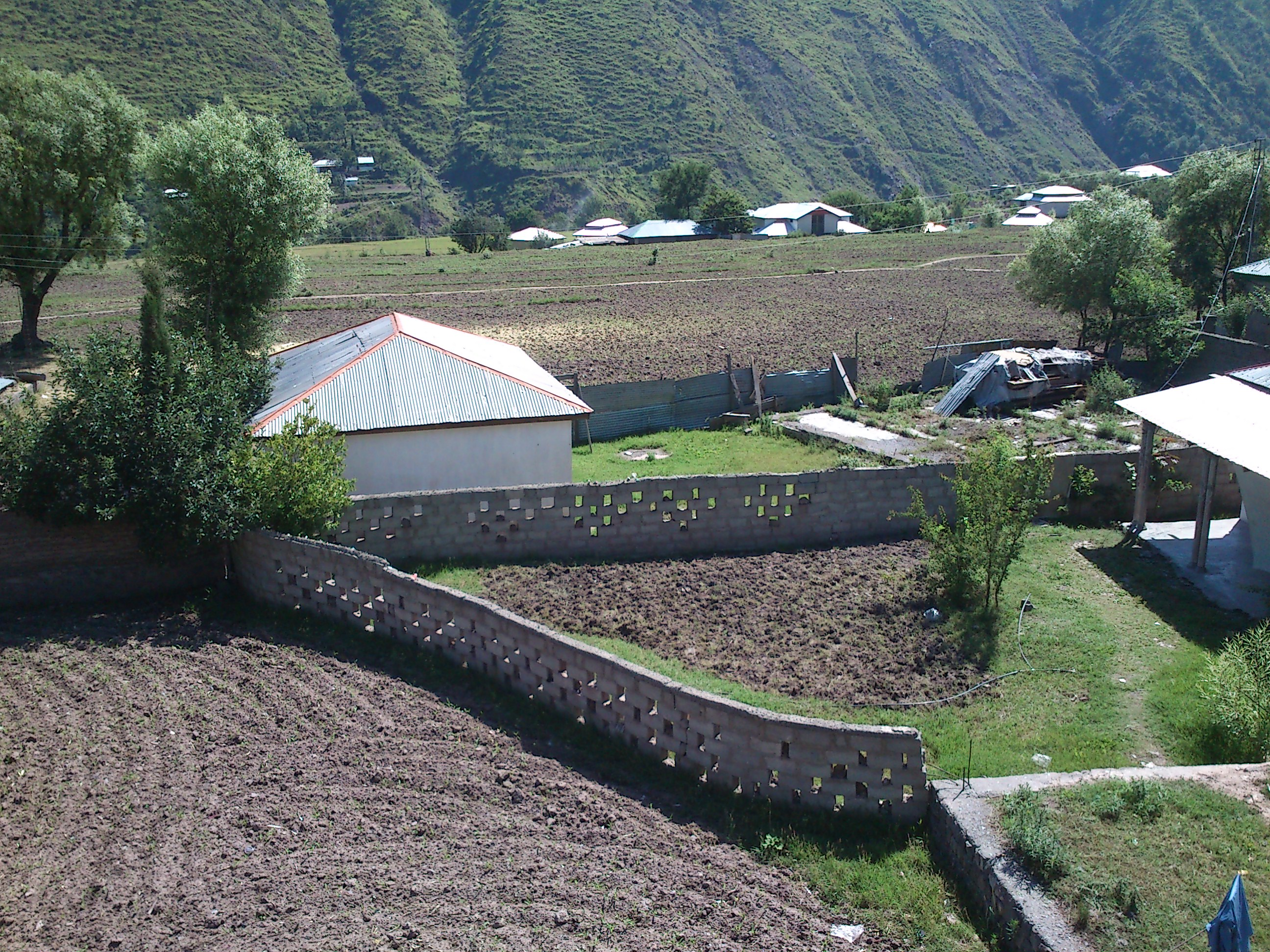
Rustic Chakothi

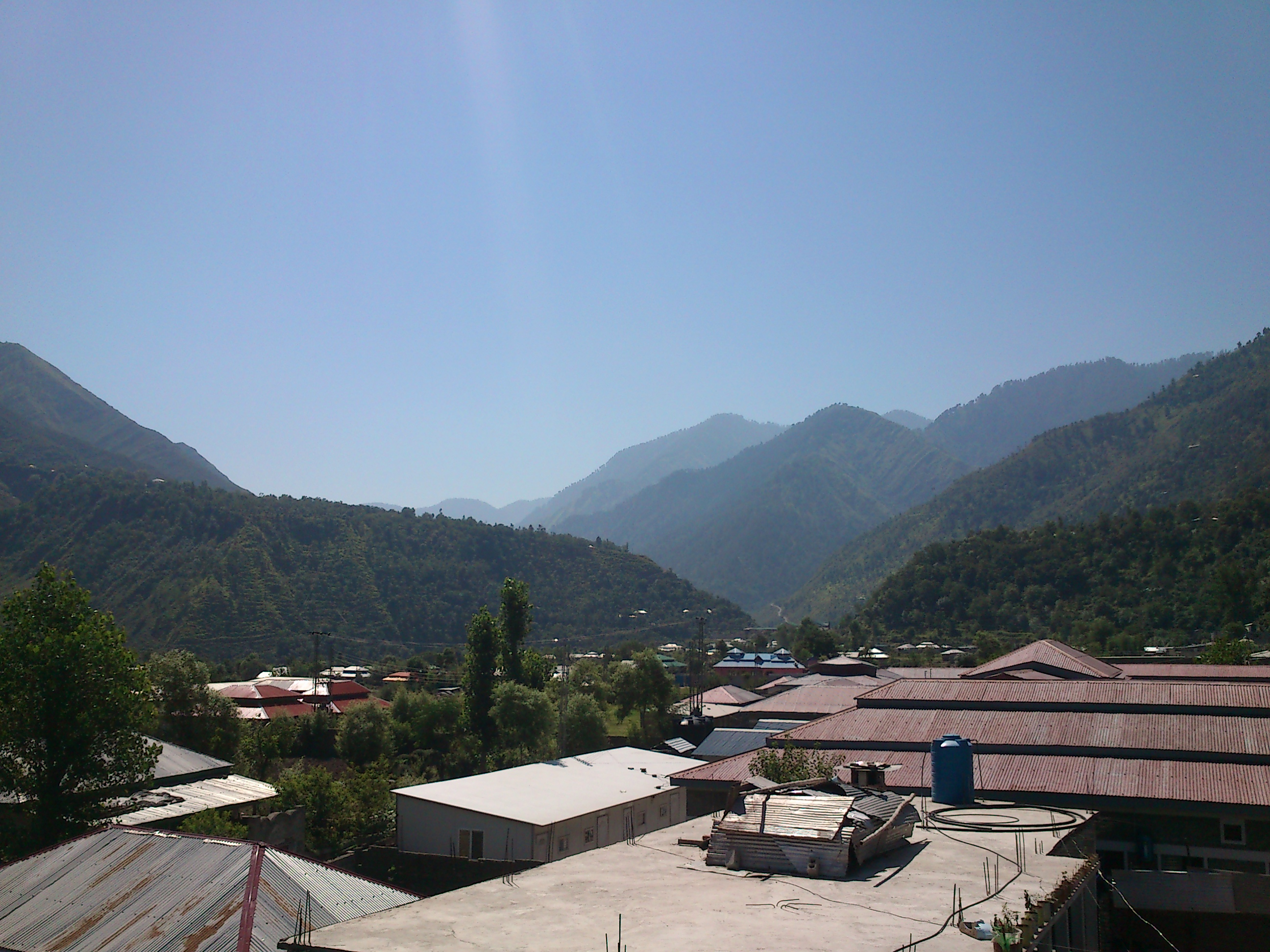
Chakothi Town
