= Kahoru =

- Gender: Female
- Language: Japanese

Origin
- Region of origin: Japan

Kahoru is a Japanese feminine given name. It may be written in hiragana or with various ateji. People with this name include:

- Kahoru Furuya (1908–2022), Japanese supercentenarian
- Kahoru Kohiruimaki (born 1967), Japanese singer
- Kahoru Sasajima (born 1974), Japanese voice actress
- Kahoru Kitazawa, character in Battle Royale
