= Ghori, Azad Kashmir =

Town in Kashmir

Kahori
- Town
- Location within Azad Kashmir Location within Pakistan
- Coordinates: 34°27′N 73°30′E
- Country: Pakistan
- Territory: Azad Kashmir
- District: Muzaffarabad
- Time zone: UTC+05:00 (PST)

Kahori, is a small town in Muzaffarabad District in Azad Kashmir, Pakistan. It lies near to the epicentre of the 2005 Kashmir earthquake. Kahori was a defensive and administratively important town during the Dogra period, when it was a major trading center.
