= Line of Control =

Demarcation line in the Kashmir region

Coordinates: 34°56′N 76°46′E

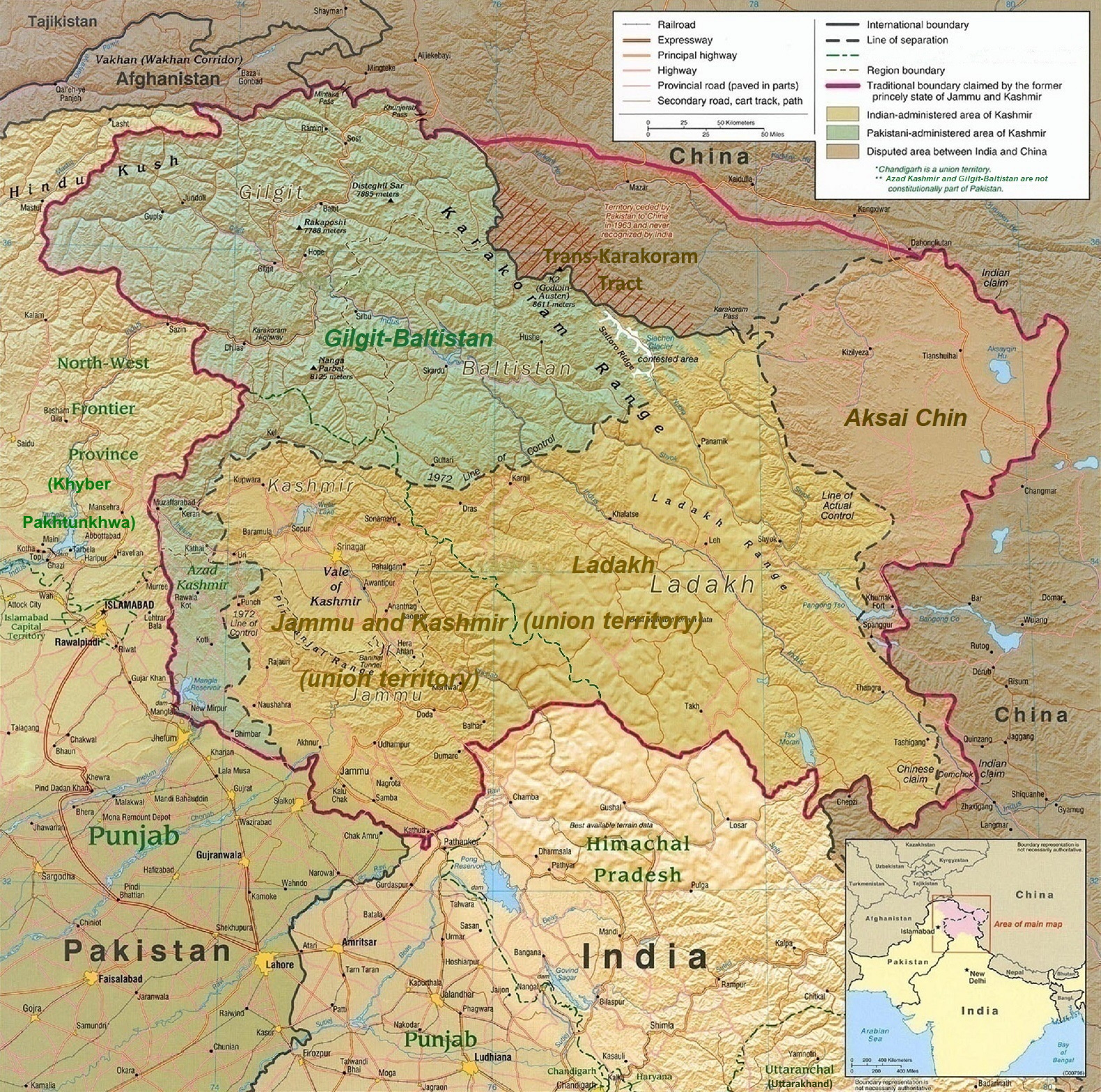
- Political map of the Kashmir region showing the Line of Control (LoC)

Characteristics
- Entities: Pakistan India
- Length: 740 km (460 mi) to 776 km (482 mi) (Note: 767 kilometres (477 mi) long according to Mahmud Ali Durrani (2001))

History
- Established: 2 July 1972; Resulting from the ceasefire of 17 December 1971 and after ratification of the Shimla Treaty
- Treaties: Simla Agreement

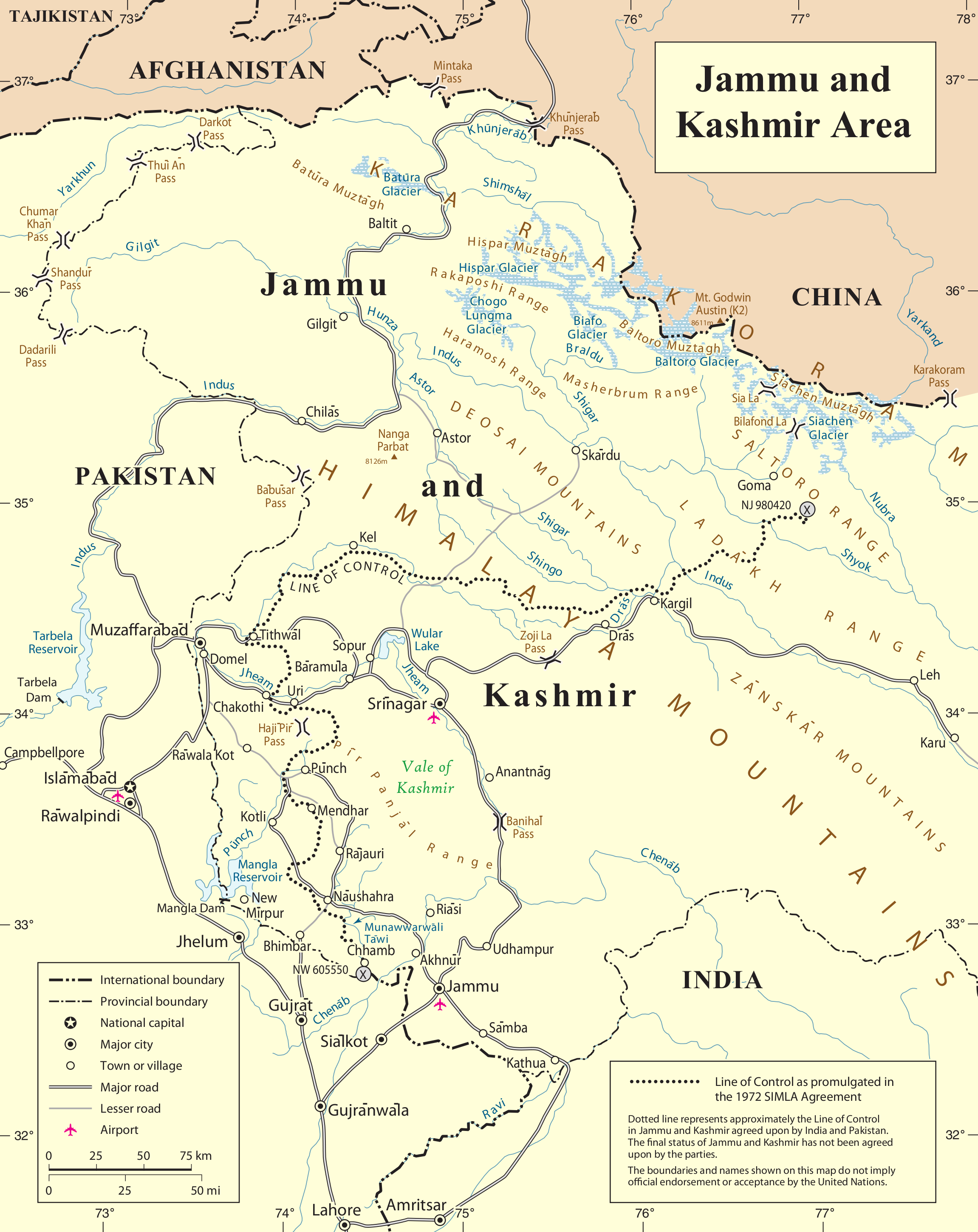
United Nations map of the Line of Control. The LoC is not defined near Siachen Glacier.

The Line of Control (LoC) is a military ceasefire line between the Indian- and Pakistani-administered parts of the former princely state of Jammu and Kashmir—a line which does not constitute a legally recognized international boundary, but serves as the de facto border. It was established as part of the Simla Agreement at the end of the Indo-Pakistani War of 1971. Both nations agreed to rename the ceasefire line as the "Line of Control" and pledged to respect it without prejudice to their respective positions. Apart from minor details, the line is roughly the same as the original 1949 cease-fire line.

The part of the former princely state under Indian control is divided into the union territories of Jammu and Kashmir and Ladakh. The Pakistani-controlled section is divided into Azad Kashmir and Gilgit–Baltistan. The northernmost point of the Line of Control is known as NJ9842, beyond which lies the Siachen Glacier, which became a bone of contention with Indian and Pakistani armed forces clashing there from 1984. To the south of the Line of Control, (Sangam, Chenab River, Akhnoor), lies the border between Pakistani Punjab and the Jammu province, which has an ambiguous status: India regards it as an "international boundary", and Pakistan calls it a "working border".

Another ceasefire line separates the Indian-controlled state of Jammu and Kashmir from the Chinese-controlled area known as Aksai Chin. Lying further to the east, it is known as the Line of Actual Control (LAC).

== Background ==
After the partition of India, present-day India and Pakistan contested the princely state of Jammu and Kashmir – India because of the ruler's accession to the country, and Pakistan by virtue of the state's Muslim-majority population. The First Kashmir War in 1947 lasted more than a year until a ceasefire was arranged through UN mediation. Both sides agreed on a ceasefire line.

After another Kashmir War in 1965, and the Indo-Pakistani War of 1971 (which saw Bangladesh become independent), only minor modifications had been effected in the original ceasefire line. In the ensuing Simla Agreement in 1972, both countries agreed to convert the ceasefire line into a "Line of Control" (LoC) and observe it as a de facto border that armed action should not violate. The agreement declared that "neither side shall seek to alter it unilaterally, irrespective of mutual differences and legal interpretations". The United Nations Military Observer Group in India and Pakistan (UNMOGIP) had the role of investigating ceasefire violations (CFVs), however their role decreased after 1971. In 2000, US President Bill Clinton referred to the Indian subcontinent and the Kashmir Line of Control, in particular, as one of the most dangerous places in the world.

== Characteristics ==
=== Terrain ===
The LoC from Kargil to Gurez comprises mountain passes and valleys with small streams and rivers. The area up to around 14,000 feet (4,300 m) is wooded while the peaks rise higher. Winter is snowy while summers are mild. From Gurez to Akhnoor, the area is mountainous and hilly respectively and is generally forested. There are tracks and minor roads connecting settlements. The mix of flora and elevation affects visibility and line of sight significantly.

=== Ceasefire violations ===
In 2018, two corps and a number of battalions of the Border Security Force manned the Indian side of the LoC. The Rawalpindi Corps manned the Pakistani side. Ceasefire violations (CFV's) are initiated and committed by both sides and show a symmetry. The response to a CFV at one location can lead to shooting at an entirely different area. Weapons used on the LoC include small arms, rocket-propelled grenades, recoilless rifles, mortars, automatic grenade launchers, rocket launchers and a number of other direct and indirect weaponry. Military personnel on both sides risk being shot by snipers in moving vehicles, through bunker peepholes and during meals.

The civilian population at the LoC, at some points ahead of the forward most post, has complicated the situation. Shelling and firing by both sides along the LoC has resulted in civilian deaths. Bunkers have been constructed for these civilian populations for protection during periods of CFV's. India and Pakistan usually report only casualties on their own sides of the LoC, with the media blaming the other side for the firing and each side claiming an adequate retaliation.

According to Happymon Jacob, the reasons for CFVs along the LoC include operational reasons (defence construction like observation facilities, the rule of the gun, lack of bilateral mechanisms for border management, personality traits and the emotional state of soldiers and commanders), politico-strategic reasons, proportional response (land grab, sniping triggered, "I am better than you", revenge firing), accidental CFVs (civilian related, lack of clarity where the line is) and other reasons (like testing the new boys, honour, prestige and humiliation, fun, gamesmanship). Jacob ranks operational reasons as the main cause for CFVs, followed by retributive and politico-strategic reasons .

=== Landmines and IEDs ===
Mines have been laid across the India–Pakistan border and the LoC in 1947, 1965, 1971 and 2001. The small stretch of land between the rows of fencing is mined with thousands of landmines. During the 2001–2002 India–Pakistan standoff thousands of acres of land along the LoC were mined. Both civilians and military personnel on both sides have died in mine and improvised explosive device (IED)-related blasts, and many more have been injured. Between January 2000 to April 2002, 138 military personnel were killed on the Indian side.

=== Posts and bunkers ===
Reinforced sandbagged and concrete posts and bunkers are among the first line of defence along the LoC. Armed soldiers man these positions with enough supplies for at least a week. The posts and bunkers allow soldiers to sleep, cook, and keep a watch on enemy positions round the clock. Some posts are located in remote locations. Animals are sometimes used to help transport loads, and at some posts animals are reared. The living quarters and the forward facing bunker are located at some distance apart. The locations of some posts do not follow any pre-ordained plan, rather they are in locations used during the First Kashmir War and the following cease-fire line, with minor adjustments made in 1972.

=== Indian LoC fencing ===
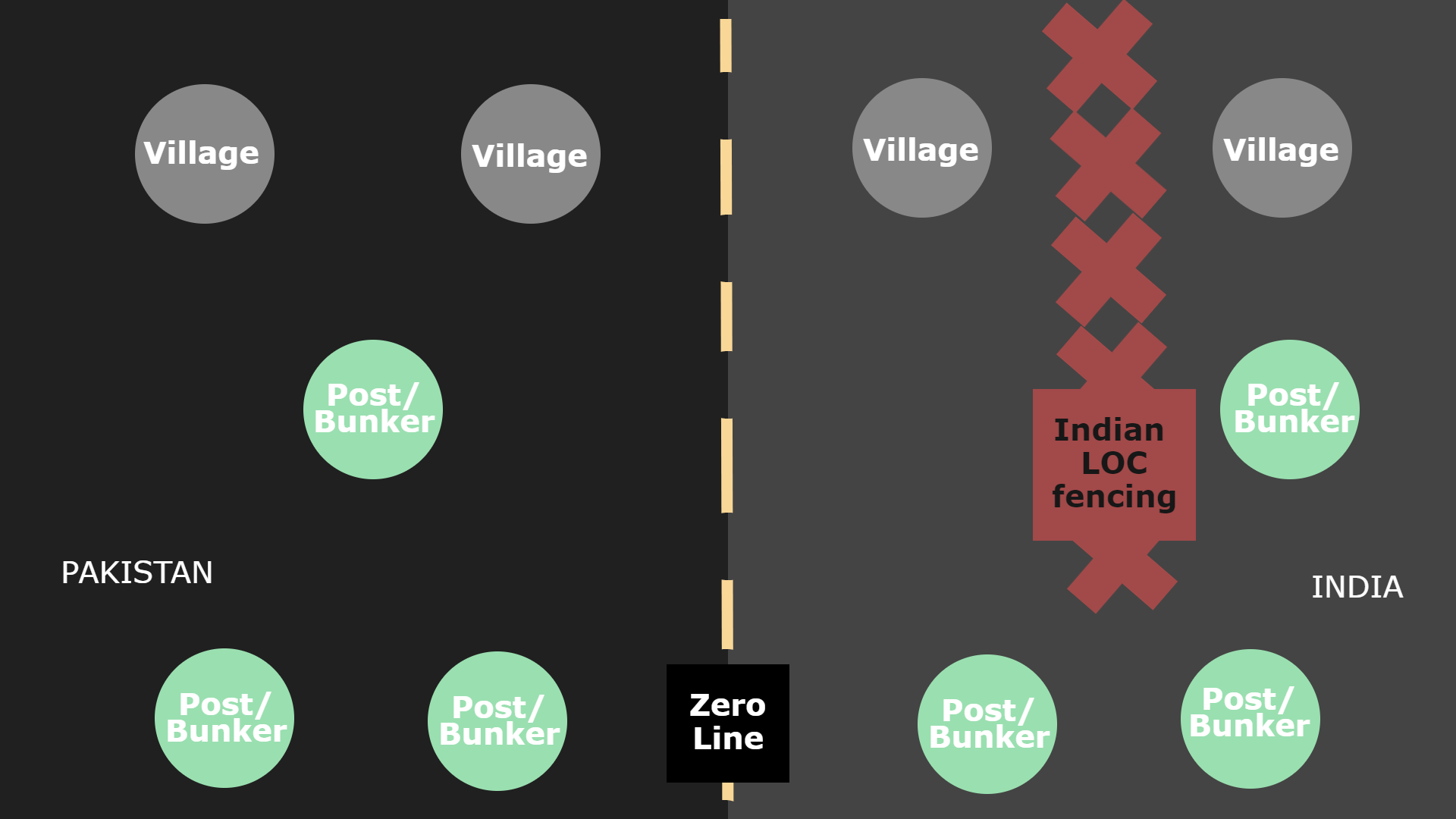
Indian fencing relative to the zero line, villages and posts/bunkers along the LoC.

India constructed a 550-kilometre (340 mi) barrier along the 740 kilometres (460 mi)–776 kilometres (482 mi) LoC by 2004. The fence generally remains about 150 yards (140 m) on the Indian-controlled side. Its stated purpose is to exclude arms smuggling and infiltration by Pakistani-based separatist militants. The barrier, referred to as an Anti-Infiltration Obstacle System (AIOS), consists of double-row of fencing and concertina wire 8–12 feet (2.4–3.7 m) in height, and is electrified and connected to a network of motion sensors, thermal imaging devices, lighting systems and alarms. They act as "fast alert signals" for the Indian troops, who can be alerted and ambush the infiltrators trying to sneak in.

The barrier's construction began in the 1990s but slowed in the early 2000s as hostilities between India and Pakistan increased. After a November 2003 ceasefire agreement, building resumed and was completed in late 2004. LoC fencing was completed in the Kashmir Valley and Jammu region on 30 September 2004. According to Indian military sources, the fence has reduced the numbers of militants who routinely cross into the Indian side of the disputed region by 80%. In 2017, a proposal for an upgraded smart fence on the Indian side was accepted.

=== Border villages ===
A number of villages lie between the Indian fence and the zero line. Pakistan has not constructed a border fence, however a number of villages lie near the zero line. In the Tithwal area, 13 villages are in front of the Indian fence. The total number between the fence and zero line on the Indian side is estimated to be 60 villages and at least one million people are spread over the districts adjacent to the LoC from Rajouri to Bandipora.

=== Infiltration and military cross-LoC movement ===
According to the Indian Ministry of Home Affairs, 1,504 "terrorists" attempted to infiltrate India in 2002. Infiltration was one of India's main issues during the 2001–2002 India–Pakistan standoff. There has been a decrease in infiltration over the years. Only a select number of individuals are successful; in 2016, the Ministry reported 105 successful infiltrations. The Indian LoC fence has been constructed with a defensive mindset to counter infiltration. The reduction in infiltration also points to a reduction in support of such activities within Pakistan. During the 2019 Balakot airstrike, Indian planes crossed the LoC for the first time in 48 years.

=== Crossing points ===
LoC crossing points in green. (Haji Peer/Silkote and Tatta Pani–Mendher crossing points approximate.)

Pakistan and India officially designated five crossing points following the 2005 Kashmir earthquake—Nauseri-Tithwal; Chakoti-Uri; Hajipur-Uri; Rawalakot-Poonch and Tattapani-Mendhar.

According to Azad Jammu and the Kashmir Cross LoC Travel and Trade Authority Act, 2016, the following crossing points are listed:

- Rawalakot–Poonch
- Chakothi–Uri
- Chaliana–Tithwal
- Tatta Pani–Mendher
- Haji Peer–Silli Kot

Trade points include: Chakothi – Salamabad and Rawalakot (Titrinote) – Poonch (Chakkan-da-Bagh). The ordinance passed in 2011.

Between 2005 and 2017, and according to Travel and Trade Authority figures, Muzaffarabad, Indian Kashmiris crossing over into Pakistan was about 14,000, while about 22,000 have crossed over to the Indian side. Crossing legally for civilians is not easy. A number of documents are required and verified by both countries, including proof of family on the other side. Even a short-term, temporary crossing invites interrogation by government agencies. The Indian and Pakistani military use these crossing points for flag meetings and to exchange sweets during special occasions and festivals. On 21 October 2008, for the first time in 61 years, cross-LoC trade was conducted between the two sides. Trade across the LoC is barter trade. In ten years, trade worth nearly PKR 11,446 crore or ₹5,000 crore (equivalent to ₹73 billion or US$760 million in 2026) has passed through the Chakothi – Salamabad crossing.

==== Chilliana – Teetwal ====
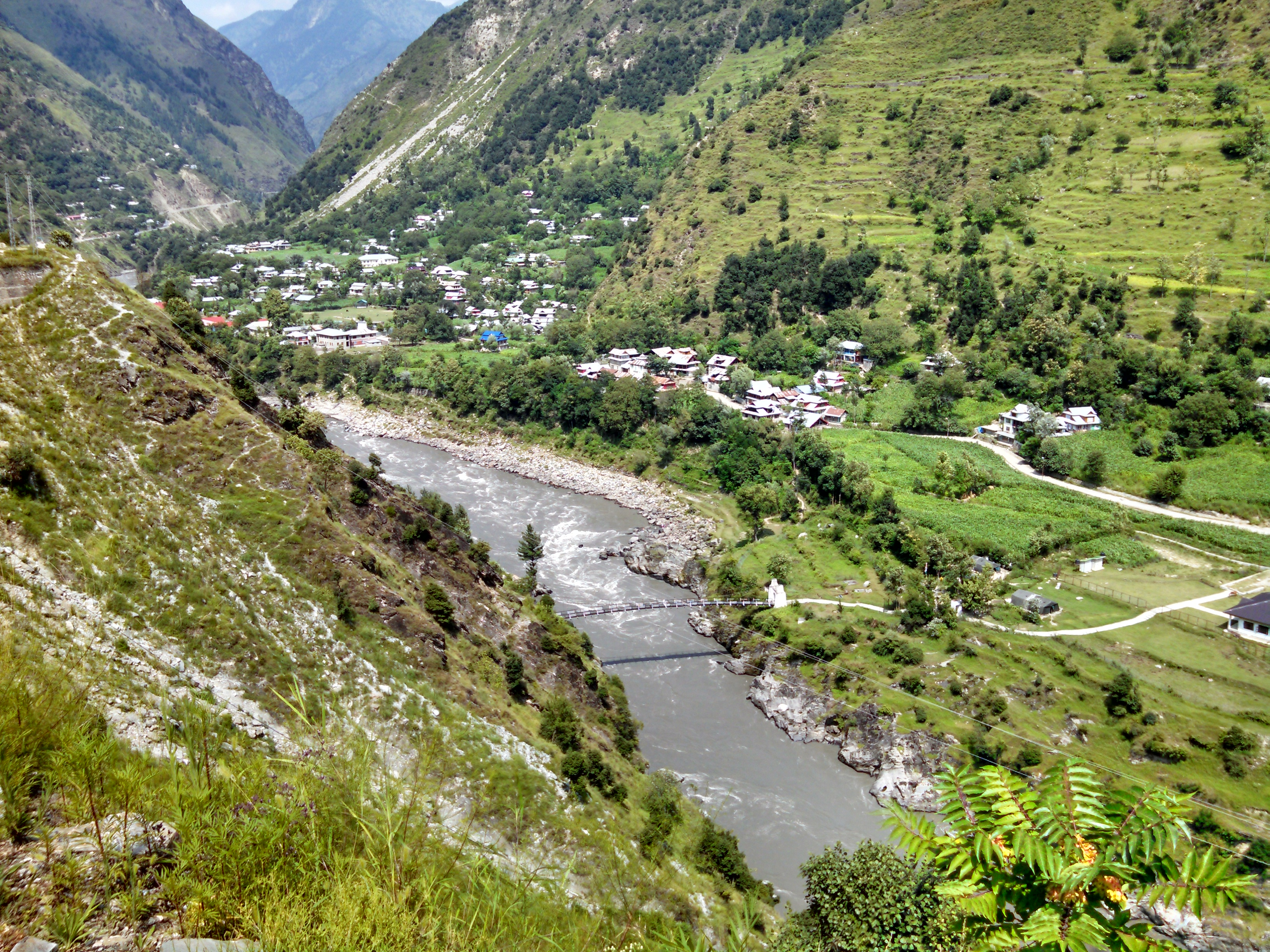
August 2015

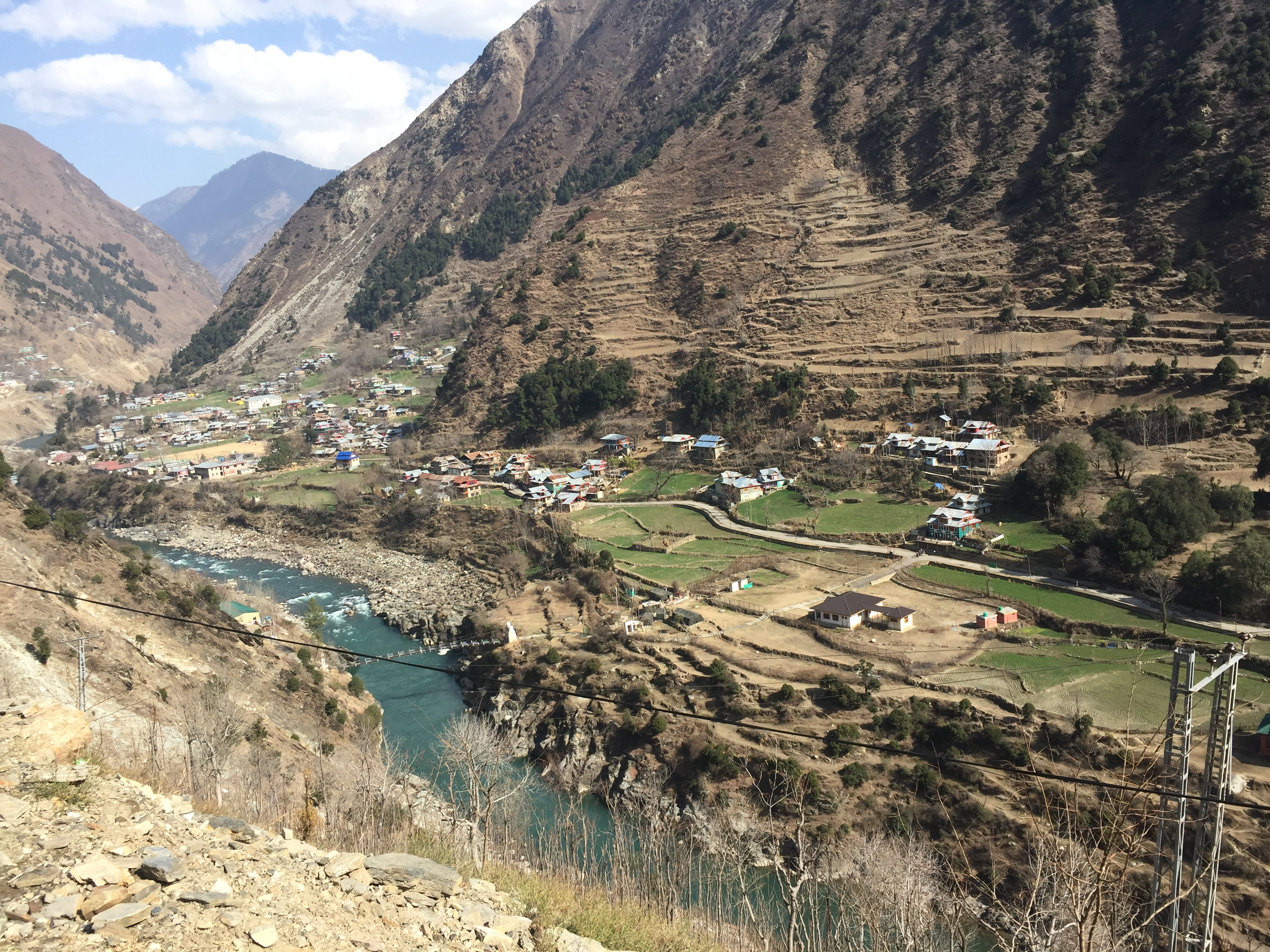
February 2018

Neelam Valley and the Chilliana – Teetwal border crossing.

The Teetwal crossing is across the Neelum River between Muzaffarabad and Kupwara. It is usually open only during the summer months, and unlike the other two crossings is open only for the movement of people, not for trade. The Tithwal bridge, first built in 1931, has been rebuilt twice.

==== Chakothi – Salamabad ====
The Salamabad crossing point, or the Kamran Post, is on the road between Chakothi and Uri in the Baramulla district of Jammu and Kashmir along the LoC. It is a major route for cross LoC trade and travel. Banking facilities and a trade facilitation centre are being planned on the Indian side. The English name for the bridge in Uri translates as "bridge of peace". The Indian Army rebuilt it after the 2005 Kashmir earthquake when a mountain on the Pakistani side caved in. This route was opened for trade in 2008 after being closed for 61 years. The Srinagar–Muzaffarabad Bus crosses this bridge on the LoC.

==== Tetrinote – Chakan Da Bagh ====
A road connects Kotli and Tatrinote on the Pakistan side of the LoC to the Indian Poonch district of Jammu and Kashmir through the Chakan Da Bagh crossing point. It is a major route for cross LoC trade and travel. Banking facilities and a trade facilitation centre are being planned on the Indian side for the benefit of traders.

Most of the flag meetings between Indian and Pakistani security forces are held here.

==== Tattapani – Mendhar ====
The fourth border crossing between Tattapani and Mendhar was opened on 14 November 2005.

== Impact on civilians ==
The Line of Control divided the Kashmir into two and closed the Jhelum valley route, the only way in and out of the Kashmir Valley from Pakistani Punjab. This ongoing territorial division severed many villages and separated family members. Some families could see each other along the LoC in locations such as the Neelum River, but were unable to meet. In certain locations, women on the Pakistan side on the LoC have been instrumental in influencing infiltration and ceasefire violations; they have approached nearby Pakistani Army camps directly and insisted infiltration stop, which reduces India's cross LoC firing.

== In popular culture ==
Documentaries covering the LoC and related events include A journey through River Vitasta, Raja Shabir Khan's Line of Control and HistoryTV18's Kargil: Valour & Victory. A number of Bollywood films on the 1999 Kargil conflict have involved depictions and scenes of the line of control including LOC: Kargil (2003), Lakshya (2004) and Gunjan Saxena: The Kargil Girl (2020). Other Bollywood films include Uri: The Surgical Strike (2019) and Bajrangi Bhaijaan (2015), and streaming television shows such as Avrodh (2020).

== See also ==
- India–Pakistan relations
- Transport between India and Pakistan
- Actual Ground Position Line – the line of separation near the Siachen Glacier
- United Nations Military Observer Group in Kashmir
