= Teetwal =

Teetwal Tithwal
- Town
- Location in Jammu and Kashmir, India Teetwal (India)
- Coordinates: 34.39°N 73.77°E
- Country: India
- Union Territory: Jammu and Kashmir
- District: Kupwara

Population (2011)
  - Total: 1,035

Languages
  - Official: Pahari, Kashmiri, Urdu, Hindi, English
- Time zone: UTC+5:30 (IST)
- PIN: 193225
- Vehicle registration: JK

Teetwal (also spelled Tithwal) is a small border Town in Jammu and Kashmir, India, a region disputed between India and Pakistan. It is situated on the banks of the Kishanganga River in Kupwara district, 82 km (51 mi) from the district headquarters and close to the Line of Control with Pakistan-administered Azad Jammu and Kashmir (AJK)

== History ==
In June 1847 Patrick Alexander Vans Agnew, who was en route to Gilgit, stopped at Teetwal. There he was met by Rajah Shere Ahmad Khan of Karnah, Khan was concerned about the rival claims of Moizoodeen Khan, Agnew described the meeting as follows: "Had a conversation with Rajah Shere Ahmed Khan. He is in reality tolerably hopeful, but pretends great fear and uncertainty lest Moizoodeen Khan’s offers should prevail at Court. Told him his failing to come in to Lieutenant Lumsden or me prevented his having any claim to be heard by me. Recommended him to give up Moizoodeen’s property to the Maharajah, and send a Vakeel to Court." Prior to the 1947 Partition of India, Teetwal used to be a commercial hub.

== Geography ==
Teetwal village is located on the Line of Control (LOC), separating Indian-administered Jammu and Kashmir from Pakistan-administered Azad Jammu and Kashmir (AJK). As per the Karachi Agreement signed by India and Pakistan in 1949, no construction is permitted within 500 yards of the zero line on LOC, and this "no construction zone" is considered a "no man's land" which is secured by both countries with landmines within their respective areas. India has constructed an Anti-Infiltration Obstacle System (AIOS) along the 734 km of LOC. AIOS is a three-tiered fencing system with checkposts and wire fences where villagers are given passage based on the smart card-based identity cards issued by the Indian Army. Teetwal is among the villages that lie between the landmine zero point on the LOC and the 3 tiers of AIOS.

== Climate ==
Climate data for Teetwal (1981–2023 via satellite observations )
Month	Jan	Feb	Mar	Apr	May	Jun	Jul	Aug	Sep	Oct	Nov	Dec	Year
Record high °C (°F)	26.1 (79.0)	29.7 (85.5)	33.5 (92.3)	38.1 (100.6)	42.0 (107.6)	44.8 (112.6)	42.5 (108.5)	36.3 (97.3)	34.0 (93.2)	33.6 (92.5)	32.1 (89.8)	27.8 (82.0)	44.8 (112.6)
Mean daily maximum °C (°F)	15.7 (60.3)	18.3 (64.9)	23.5 (74.3)	28.1 (82.6)	32.8 (91.0)	35.1 (95.2)	34.3 (93.7)	26.5 (79.7)	27.1 (80.8)	26.3 (79.3)	23.7 (74.7)	18.1 (64.6)	25.8 (78.4)
Mean daily minimum °C (°F)	2.8 (37.0)	3.5 (38.3)	8.3 (46.9)	13.6 (56.5)	18.1 (64.6)	23.1 (73.6)	21.4 (70.5)	17.3 (63.1)	12.8 (55.0)	10.2 (50.4)	8.7 (47.7)	4.2 (39.6)	12.0 (53.6)
Record low °C (°F)	−15.1 (4.8)	−14.7 (5.5)	−8.3 (17.1)	−2.1 (28.2)	−1.5 (29.3)	5.8 (42.4)	9.1 (48.4)	7.5 (45.5)	3.8 (38.8)	−2.6 (27.3)	−4.3 (24.3)	−13.1 (8.4)	−15.2 (4.6)
Average rainfall mm (inches)	40.2 (1.58)	44.6 (1.76)	104.7 (4.12)	140.1 (5.52)	84.9 (3.34)	62.4 (2.46)	234.2 (9.22)	431.8 (17.00)	343.4 (13.52)	142.1 (5.59)	82.0 (3.23)	40.3 (1.59)	1,750.7 (68.93)
Average rainy days	5.7	6.2	11.6	10.8	4.7	3.4	15.8	21.5	17.3	8.5	6.4	6.1	118
Source: India Meteorological Department

== Maa Sharda Devi temple ==
On 22 March 2023, Union Home Minister Amit Shah re-inaugurated the Sharda Devi temple in Teetwal, Karnah in Kupwara district, which is close to the Line of Control. The construction work on the Sharda Peeth base temple at Teetwal started after local Muslims handed over the land for the construction of a temple in 2021. They also remained part of the construction of the temple and its inauguration. The architecture and reconstruction of the Maa Sharda Devi temple was carried in accordance with scriptures under the aegis of Sharada Peeth, and the temple was inaugurated on the first day of Chaitra Navratri. The Kumbhabhisheka of the temple was performed by the successor-designate of the Jagadguru Shankaracharya of Sringeri, Sri Vidhushekhara Bharati Mahaswamiji in June 2023. A mosque is also being constructed near this temple. The Teetwal temple of Maa Sharda Devi was the base camp for Sharada Peeth prior to partition. The temple was destroyed by tribal raiders in 1947. Sharada Peeth is situated barely 40 kilometers from Teetwal.

== Administration ==
Teetwal has an elected gram panchayat for local governance. There is a school with 400 students and an irrigation canal constructed with the INR 2,200,000 provided by the Indian Army under the Operation Sadbhavana, and several bunkers to protect villagers from the shelling and firing by the Pakistan Army.

== Demographics ==
According to the 2011 census of India, Teetwal has 187 households. The literacy rate of Teetwal village was 73.75% compared to 67.16% of Jammu and Kashmir. In Teetwal, male literacy stands at 89.89% while female literacy is 55.67%.

Demographics (2011 Census)
	le		
Population	1035	549	486
Children aged below 6 years	193	104	89
Scheduled caste	0	0	0
Scheduled tribe	103	51	52
Literacy	73.75%	89.89%	55.67%
Workers (all)	235	211	24
Main workers (total)	161	–	–
Marginal workers (total)	74	71	3

== Transport ==
=== Road ===
Teetwal in India, is right on the Line of Control between India and Pakistan, is connected to Tangdhar in India via the "Gundishat Bridge-Teetwal Road". NH 701 which begins at Tangdhar, provides further connectivity to other places in Jammu and Kashmir and beyond in India.

==== Tithwal International Bridge ====
Tithwal Bridge is one of the five crossing points along the Line of Control between India and Pakistan. It was first constructed in 1931, but was destroyed in the First Kashmir war. However, in 1988, the bridge was reconstructed jointly by India and Pakistan. This bridge connects the "Srinagar-Sopore-Tangdhar-Teetwal road" in India to the "Muzaffarabad-Nausadda-Kundal Shahi road" in Pakistan.

=== Rail ===
The nearest railway stations to Teetwal are Baramulla railway station 118 kilometres (73 mi) and Sopore railway station, 116 km away, both are on Baramulla-Sopore-Srinagar-Jammu railway line and these are reachable by a 3.5 hour drive by road from Tangdhar.

=== Air ===
The nearest airport is Srinagar International Airport, located at a distance of 168 kilometres (104 mi).

== See also ==
- Kupwara
- Lolab Valley
- Kupwara district
- Tulail Valley
- Teetwal
