= Khasas =

Ancient Indo-Tibetan group

Khasas (Sanskrit: खश, IAST: Khaśa) were an ancient Indian tribe and a late Janapada kingdom from Himalayan regions of northern Indian subcontinent mentioned in the various historical Indian inscriptions and ancient Indian Hindu and Tibetan literature. European sources described the Khasa tribe living in the Northwest Himalayas and the Roman geographer Pliny the Elder specifically described them as "Indian people". They were reported to have lived around Gandhara, Trigarta and Madra Kingdom as per the Mahabharata.

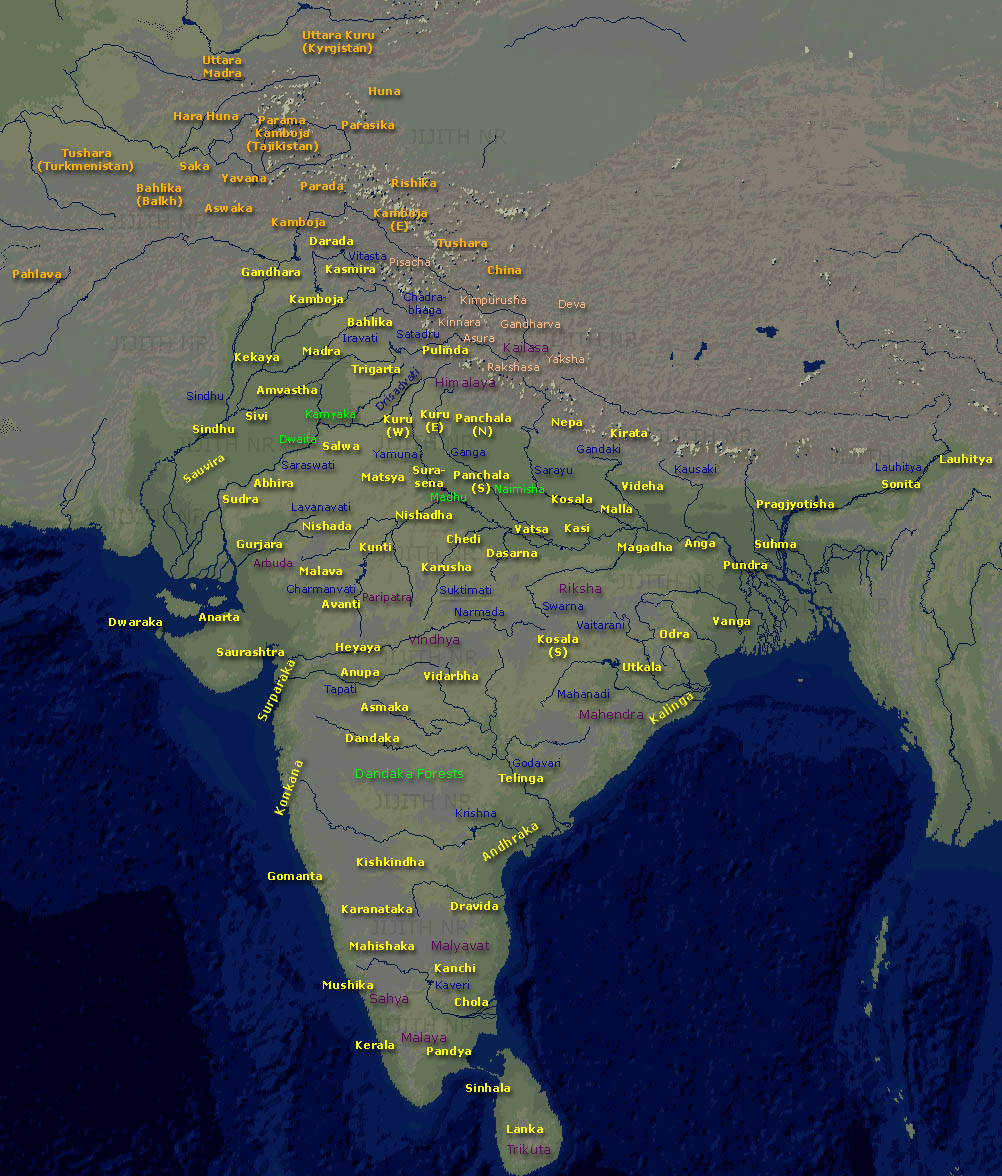
Tribes and nations in the ancient Epic Map of India; Khasas are described to have lived around Gandhara, Trigarta and Madra Kingdom

== Names and variants ==
The original spelling for the name in Sanskrit literature is Khaśa (Sanskrit: खश) while variants of the name also used are Khasa (खस), Khaṣa (खष) and Khaśīra (खशीर).

== Modern sources ==
According to E.T. Atkinson, the Jaunsar-Bawar is the representative Khasiya tract and it

"..forms a very important link between the almost Hinduized Khasiyas of Kumaon and their brethren converts to Islam on the ethnical frontier of the mountains of Hindu Kush and gives customs and practices of Khasiya race in full force at the present day which distinguished them thousands of years ago."

== Indian sources ==
=== Ancient literature ===
As per the research conducted by political scientist Sudama Misra, the Khasa Janapada was a late Janapada (around 1100–500 BCE) under the broad division of Parvata-spraying Āryāvarta (Himalayan Āryāvarta) of the ancient Indian Iron Age.

The Manusmṛiti mentions the Khaśa as Kṣatriya-s formerly, due to omission of the sacred-rites and neglect of Brāhmaṇā-s.

But by the omission of the sacred rites, and also by their neglect of Brāhmaṇas, the following Kṣatriya castes have gradually sunk to the position of the low-born.—(43)

The Puṇḍrakas, the Coḍas, the Draviḍas, the Kāmbojas, the Yavanas, the Śākas, the Pāradas, the Pahlavas, the Cīnas, the Kirātas, the Daradas and the Khaśas.—(44)

The Manusmriti describes them as descendants of outcast Kshatriyas.

The Bhagavata Purana gives a list of various outcast tribes, the Khaśas also one of them, which have recovered salvation by adopting the religion of Viṣṇu Vaishnavism. The Mahabharata mentions the Khasas as one of the northern tribes who fought on the side of the Kaurava against Satyaki. In the Karna Parva of Mahabharata, Khasas are mentioned living in the Panjab region between Āraṭṭa and Vasāti:

prasthalā Madra-Gandhāra Āraṭṭa nāmatah Khaśāh Vasāti Sindhu-sauvīrā

In the Sabhaparvan of the Mahabharata, they are mentioned between Meru and Mandara along with Kulindas and Tanganas, who brought presents of Piplika gold to Yudhisthira. In Dronaparvan of the Mahabharata, they are mentioned with other northwestern tribes such as Daradas, Tanganas, Lampakas and Kulindas. The Vaishnava text Harivamsa describes that the Khasas were defeated by the King Sagara. The Markandeya Purana states that the Khasa is a country against the mountain. The Markandeya Purana, Vayu Purana and Kalki Purana describe that Khasas together with Sakas and other tribes have penetrated to the northwest of India. The Skanda Purana mentions the region of Himachal Pradesh and Kumaon-Garhwal as Kedare-Khasa-Mandale.

=== Medieval literature ===
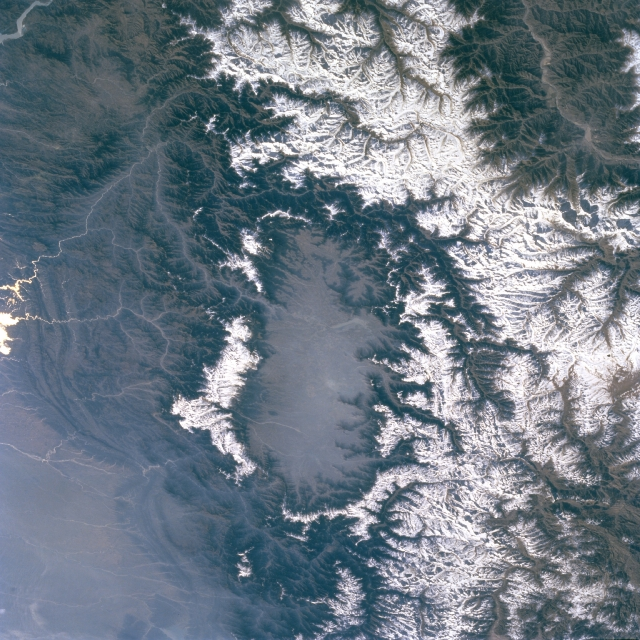
Kashmir Valley seen from space; "..the valley lying to the south and west of the Pir Panjal Range (white) which is surrounded by the Jhelum River) in the west and Kishtwar in the east" as the expanse of Khasas as per the Nilamata Purana

The Brihat Samhita authored by Indian polymath Varāhamihira grouped Khasas with Kulutas, Kashmiras, Tanganas, and Kunatas. The Mudrarakshasa of Indian poet Vishakhadatta mentions that Khasas and Magadhas were Ganas (troops) in the army of Rakshasa and Malayaketu. According to an ancient Kashmiri text Nilamata Purana compiled by Indian scholar Ved Kumari Ghai, the Khasa tribe occupied

"the valley to the south and west of the Pir Pantsal range between the middle course of the Vitasta (modern Jhelum River) in the west and Kastavata (modern Kishtwar) in the east."

This assertion is also corroborated by the later 12th-century text Rajatarangini translated by British archaeologist Sir Marc Aurel Stein. The Bharata Nātyaśāstra by the Indian musicologist Bharata Muni mentions that the mother tongue language of Khaśas was Bāhliki language in the phrase

"Bāhlikabhāśodhīchyanāṃ Khaśāṇāṃ ca svadeśajā." (Translation : The Bahliki language is the native tongue of the Northerners and Khasas.)

The Kavyamimamsa of Rajashekhara mentions the Kuluta king with the title Khasadhipati. The inscription of Dadda II (also known as Praśāntarāga) mentions about the Khasas in the phrase "...Yascopamiyate - sat - kataka - samunnata vidhyadharavasa taya Himachale na Khasa parivarataya."

== European sources ==
Greek Geographer Ptolemy contended that the country of Khasas (referred to as 'Khasia') was located near the Trans-Himalayan range of Northwest India. Roman Geographer Pliny noted that

The mountain races between the Indus and the Jomanes are the Cesi, the Catriboni who dwell in the forest.

E.T. Atkinson speculated that Pliny referred to the terms, Cesi and Catriboni in the above quotations to Khasa and Kshatriya. Irish linguist Sir George Abraham Grierson in his work Linguistic Survey of India (Volume 9 Part 4) mentions the remarks by the Roman Geographer Pliny on the Khasa (referred as 'Casiri') tribe with the imputations of cannibalism. Pliny further stated them as "an Indian people":

Latin Source (Gabriel Brotier edition):
Ab Attacoris gentes Phruri, et Tochari: et jam Indorum Casiri, introrsus ad Scythas versi, humanis corporibus vescuntur.
English Translation:

"Next to the Attacori [ Uttarakuru ] are the nations of the Thuni and the Forcari; then come the Casiri [Khasiras], an Indian people who look towards the Scythians and feed on human flesh."

Indian sociologist R.N. Saksena explains that this imputation was due to the existing suspicion towards Khasas by the Vedic Aryans, though he regards them as the earlier wave of the same 'Aryan settler' group.

== Tibetan sources ==
The Mongolian-Tibetan historian Sumpa Yeshe Peljor (writing in the 18th century) lists the Khasas alongside other peoples found in Central Asia since antiquity, including the Yavanas (Greeks), Kambojas, Tukharas, Hunas and Daradas.

== Descendants ==
Irish linguist Sir G.A. Grierson asserted that "..the great mass of the Aryan speaking population of the lower Himalaya from Kashmir to Darjeeling is inhabited by tribes descended from the ancient Khasas of Mahabharata." The Khasa peoples are the Khakhas of Jhelum Valley, the Kanets of Kangra and Garhwal, Khŏś/Khośyā of Jaunsar-Bawar and regions adjacent to it in Uttarkashi and Tehri districts of Uttarakhand and Shimla and Sirmaur districts of Himachal Pradesh, the bulk population of Garhwal and Kumaon referred as "Khasia", also in Garhwal and Kumaon the local Zamindars and Thakur as well as The Kshatriyas were also known as Khasiya the most famous example of it is from the folktale of Haruhit A Kumaoni folktale describing the valour of a Prince named Haruhit in the poem there's a phrase "Bamano ko gyan thulo, Khasiye ki risa, Baniye ki Chaturai, Bhaise ki tisa" meaning the no one should underestimate the knowledge of a Brahmin, strength/anger of a Khasiya/Kshatriya, intelligence of a Baniya and hardwork of a buffalo referring to Shudra. The Nepali speaking Khas people of Nepal ruled Nepal as Khas empire, Shah dynasty later they were also integrated into Kshatriya and Brahmin societies and the Khas Kshatriya adopted the title "Chhetri" short of "Kshatriya" title, while The Khas Brahmins adopted the title "Bahun". The Khas Chettris form 16% and Khas Bahuns form 12% of total population of Nepal.

=== Khasas under Katyuris ===
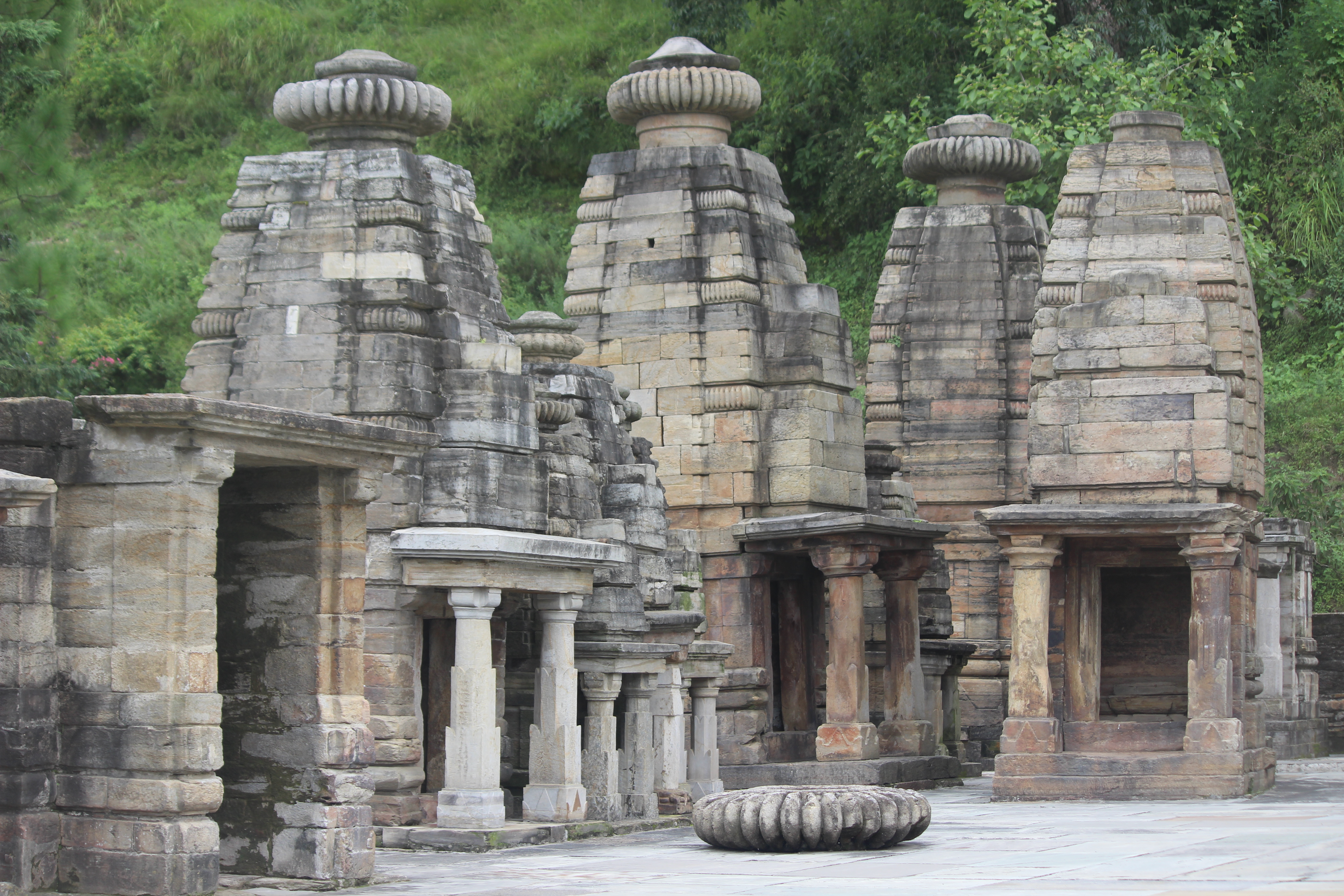
Sun Temple at Katarmal

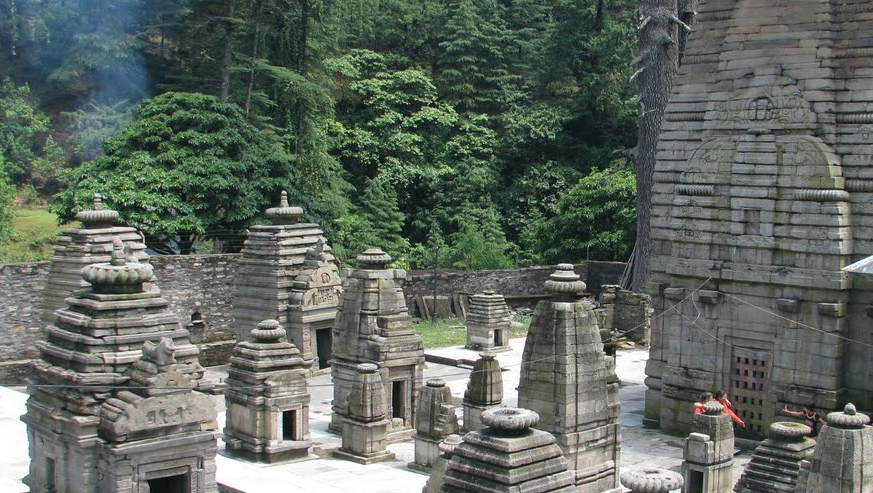
Jageshwar Temples Complex

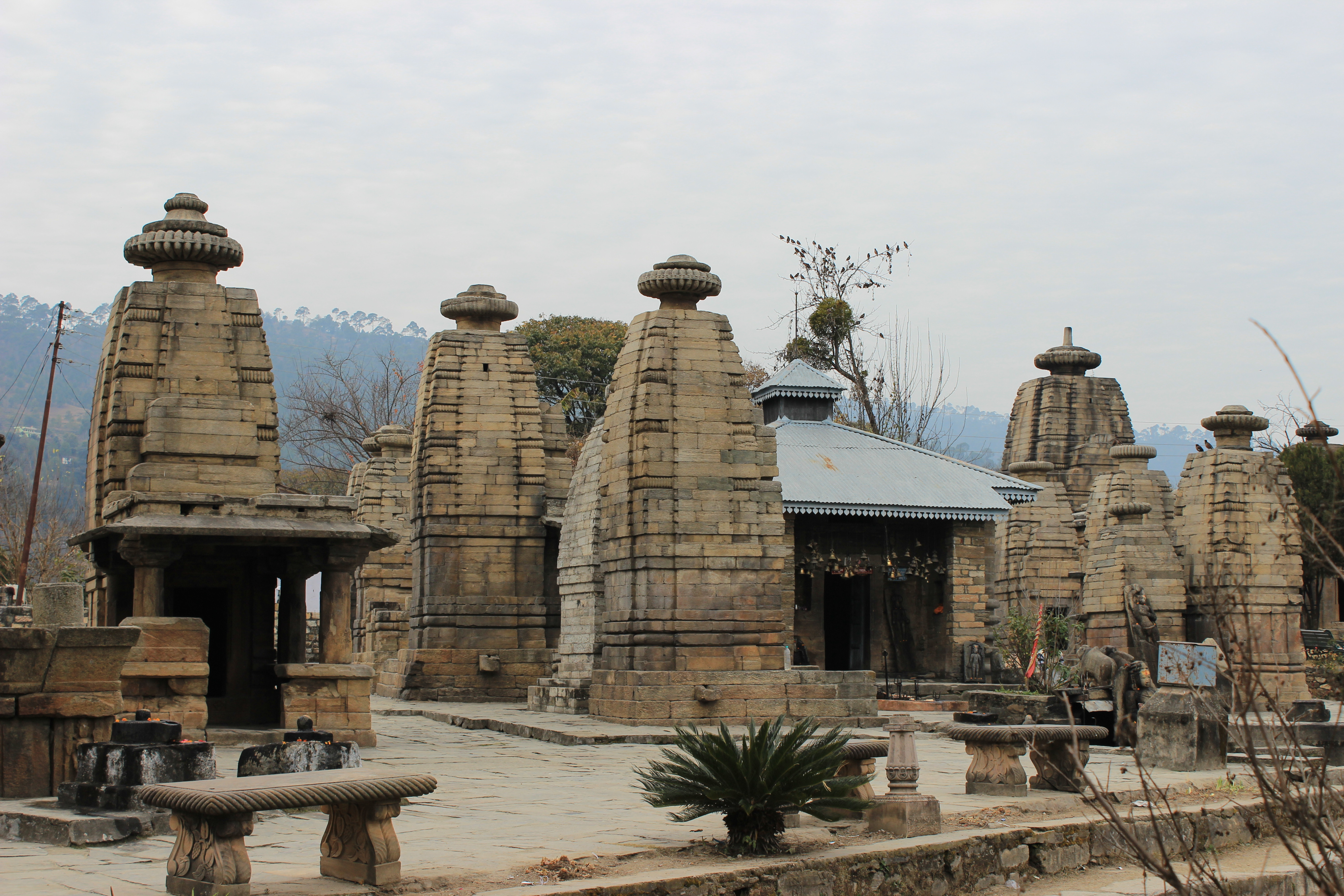
Baijnath Temple Complex

Several temples in Uttarakhand are attributed to the Katyuri Kings.

The Katyuris were of the Khasha origin as agreed by most scholars. They belonged to the Khasha people that entirely dominated the inner Himalayan belt up to Nepal and they extensively populated the mountainous regions of Uttarakhand. Previously, Khashas had strongly established themselves from Afghanistan to Nepal in the ancient period and as per internal evidence, they managed the village-level theocratic republics like Gram-Rajya and Mandals under various local clans and identities. Katyuri was one of the ruling houses of Joshimath that claimed sovereignty over other Gram Rajyas of the entire territory. The Katyuris ruled from Joshimath in the Alaknanda Valley and later they shifted their capital to Baijnath.

=== Khasas of Nepal ===
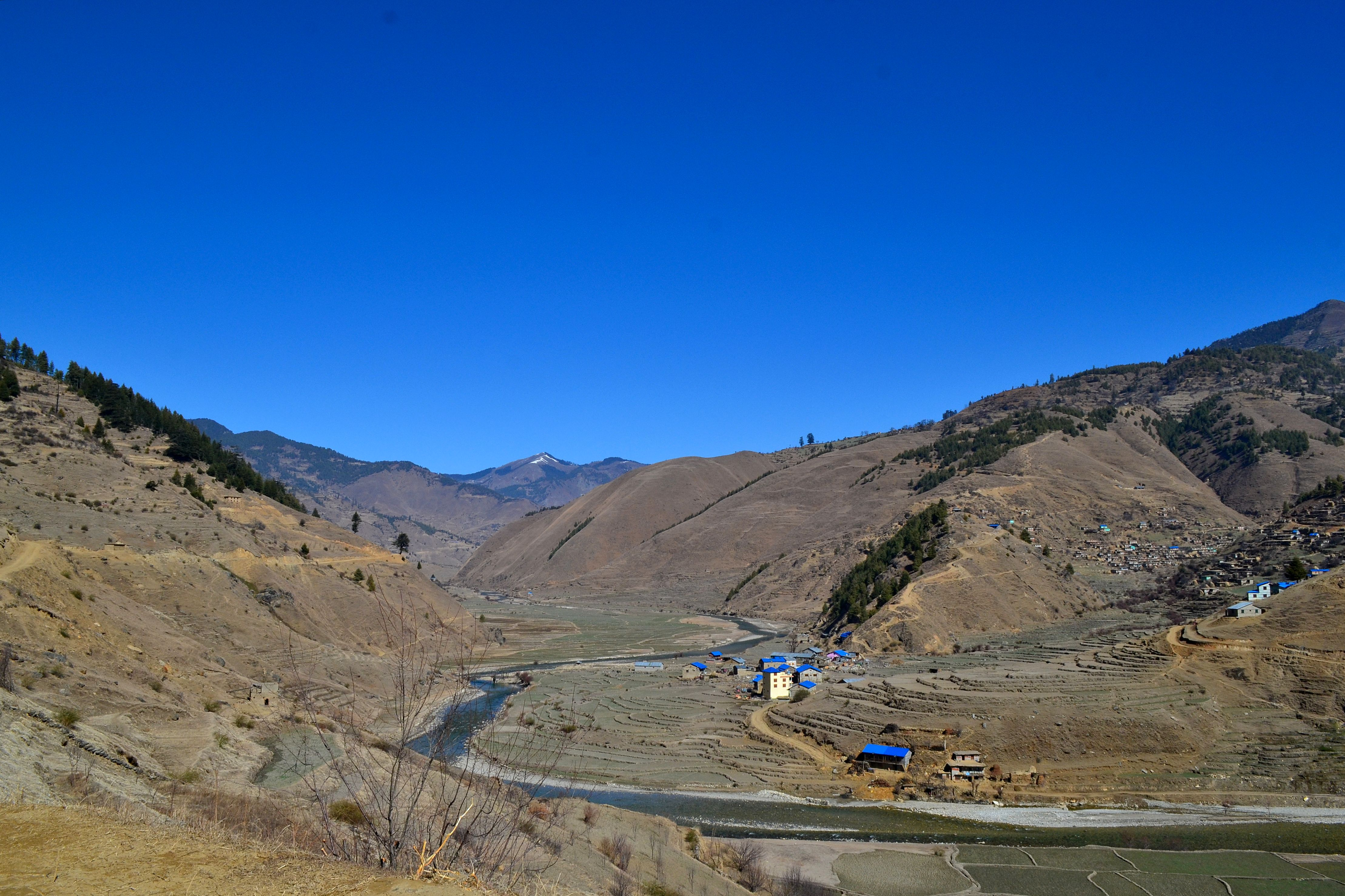
Sinja Valley, capital of Khas Mallas where earliest Devanagari scripts from the 13th century

Khasas are thought to be connected to the medieval Khasa Malla kingdom and the modern Khas people of Nepal. The modern Khas people of Nepal have also been connected with the ancient Khasas, although their period of migration in Nepal remains ambiguous. In Nepal the Khas people first settled around present-day Humla and Jumla. The Khasa kings of Nepal formed the famous Malla Kingdom, which ruled Humla from the eleventh century before collapsing and splintering into local chiefdoms during the fourteenth century. The Khasas (identified with Khasa Mallas) are also mentioned in several Indian inscriptions dated between 8th and 13th centuries CE. The 954 AD Khajuraho Inscription of Dhaṇga states Khasa kingdom equivalent to Gauda of Bengal and Gurjara-Pratihara dynasty. The Nalanda inscription of Devapala and Bhagalpur; a copper plate of Narayanapala also mentions Khasas. The three copper plates from Pandukeshavara explain the territories of Khasas. List of Khasa surname: 1. Awasthi 2. Bhandari 3. koirala 4. Dixit 5. Negi 6. Tiwar 7. Tripathee 8. Sharma 9. Upadhyay 10. Ojha 11. Mishra 12. Rawal 13. Rijal

=== Khasas of Jammu ===
Rajapuri (Rajouri), the seat of the lord of the Khasas in the present day Jammu and Kashmir, India

The 12th-century text Rajatarangini translated by British archaeologist Sir Marc Aurel Stein links the Khasas with northwestern affiliations. It describes at

No such difficulity arises as regards the Khaśas so frequently mentioned in the Kashmir Chronicles. It can be shown from a careful examination of all the passages that their seat was to comparatively limited region, which may be roughly described as comprising the valleys lying immediately to the S. and W. of Pir Panjal range, between the middle course of Vitastā in the W. and Kāṣṭavāṭa in the E. Finally we have evidence of the latter’s settlements in the valley of Khaśālaya, it is certainly the valley of khaiśāl, which leads from Marbal Pass in S.E. corner of Kaśmir down to Kishtwar

Rajatarangini describes the rulers of Rajapuri (modern Rajauri) as the "lord of the Khasas". It also describes the chiefs of the Lohara as Khasas. The Khasa chiefs of Rajapuri freely intermarried with Kshatriya rulers of Kashmir while the Khasa chief of Lohara, Simharaja, married a daughter of Shahi Kings of Kabul. The descendants of the royal family of Rajauri later became Muslim Rajput chiefs and they retained the rulership of the territory till the 19th century. Stein also identified the modern Khakhas as descendants of Khasas mentioned in the Rajatarangini. The Bomba clan are descended from the medieval Khas people of Kashmir that inhabited the entire Karnah region of Kashmir. The region of khaśāli which M.A. stein identifies as Khaśalaya is situated in the left bank of the chenab river was identified and studied by Siddheshwar Varma in 1938 in his linguistic survey.

== See also ==
- Kingdoms of Ancient India
- List of ancient Indo-Aryan peoples and tribes
- Kuru kingdom
- Uttarakuru
- Kambojas
- Gandharas
- Daradas
- Kashmiras
- Madra
- Sakas, ancient Scythians mentioned in Sanskrit literatures

== Books ==
- Acharya, Baburam (1975), Bhandari, Devi Prasad (ed.), "Ei. Shi. Baburam Acharya Rachana garnubhayeko nepalko samkshipta itihasa" (PDF), Purnima, 8 (4), Kathmandu: 197–206, archived from the original (PDF) on 13 May 2024
- Adhikary, Surya Mani (1997). The Khaśa kingdom: a trans-Himalayan empire of the middle age. Nirala Publications. ISBN 978-81-85693-50-7.
- Grierson, George Abraham (1916). Linguistic Survey of India, Volume 9, Part 4. Vol. 9. Office of the superintendent of government printing, India.
- Handa, O. C. (Omacanda) (2002). History of Uttaranchal. New Delhi: Indus Publishing. ISBN 9788173871344.
- Misra, Sudama (1973). Janapada state in ancient India. Vārāṇasī: Bhāratīya Vidyā Prakāśana. Archived from the original on 17 August 2016.
- Mohan, Krishna (1981). Early medieval history of Kashmir: with special reference to the Loharas, A.D. 1003–1171. Meharchand Lachhmandas Publications.
- Pliny The Elder (1826). Gabriel Brotier (ed.). C. Plinii Secundi Naturalis historiae libri XXXVII: Lib. VI-VIII. London: A.J. Valpy.
- Saklani, Dinesh Prasad (1998). Ancient Communities of the Himalaya. Indus Publishing. ISBN 9788173870903.
- Saksena, R.N. (2019). "Marriages and Family in the Polyandrous Khasa tribe of Jaunsar-Bawar". In George Kurrian (ed.). The Family in India: A Regional View. Walter de Gruyter GmbH & Co KG. pp. 108–118. ISBN 9783110886757.
- Sharma, Megha (2019), "The region of Kashmir in Ancient Literature with special mention to Tribes" (PDF), Pramana Research Journal, 9 (6): 703–707, ISSN 2249-2976
- Singh, M.R. (1972). Geographical data in the early Puranas: A critical study. Punthi Pustak.
- Stein, Marc Aurel (1979) [1900]. "Chronological and Dynastic Tables of Kalhana's Record of Kasmir Kings". Kalhana's Rajatarangini: A Chronicle of the Kings of Kasmir. Vol. 1. Motilal Banarsidass. ISBN 9780896841017.
- Stein, Mark Aurel (1989) [1900]. Kalhana's Rajatarangini: a chronicle of the kings of Kasmir, Volume 2 (Reprinted ed.). Motilal Banarsidass. ISBN 978-81-208-0370-1.
- Thakur, Laxman S. (1990). "The Khaśas: An Early Indian Tribe". In K. K. Kusuman (ed.). A Panorama of Indian Culture: Professor A. Sreedhara Menon Felicitation Volume. Mittal Publications. pp. 285–293. ISBN 978-81-7099-214-1.
