= Khas people =

Indo-Aryan ethno-linguistic group of Nepal and India

Khas Khashiya Khas Arya
खस (Nepali)
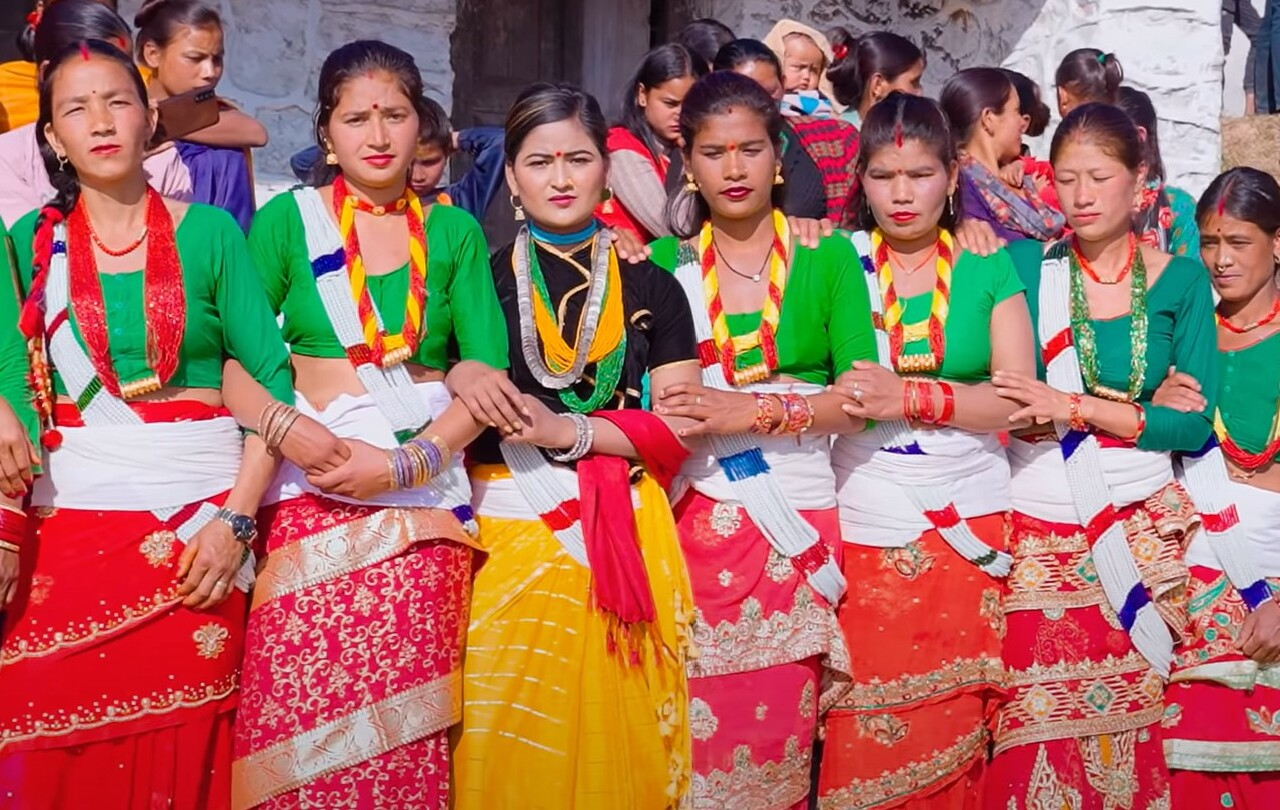
- Portrait of Khas women holding hands and performing Deuda

Total population
- c. 15.3 million

Regions with significant populations
- Nepal, India, Bhutan

Languages
- Nepali and Western Pahari languages

Religion
- Hinduism

Related ethnic groups
- Kumaoni, Garhwali, Pahari and other Indo-Aryans

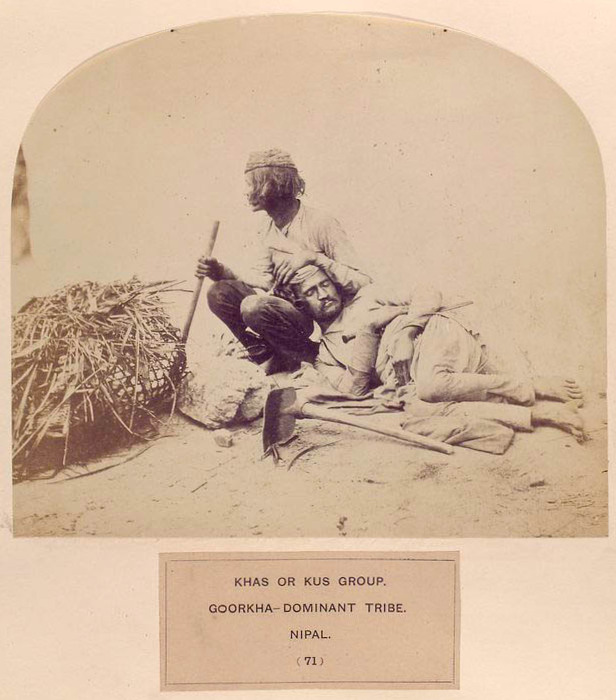
Khas Tribe of Nepal

Khas peoples or Khas Tribes, (English: /kɑːs/; Nepali: खस) popularly known as Khashiya (Note: Khas Arya is popularly used terminology over the various media to denote the group. The Constitution of Nepal considers the Kshetris, Thakuris, and Sanyasis (Dashnami) as "Khas" for the electoral purposes.) are an Indo-Aryan ethno-linguistic group native to the Himalayan region of South Asia, in what is now the South Asian country of Nepal, as well as the Indian states of Uttarakhand, Himachal Pradesh, West Bengal, Assam and Sikkim. (Note: Sociologist R.N. Saksena identified the Kanets of Kangra and Garhwal, the Khosa of Jaunsar-Bawar and the bulk population of Garhwal and Kumaon (referred as "Khasia") as being descended from the Khasas. Historian Sir Marc Aurel Stein further identified the modern Khakha Rajput community as the Khas people in the Azad Kashmir state of Pakistan and the modern Bomba clan in the Karnah region of Jammu and Kashmir.)

According to the Constitution of Nepal, Bahun, Kshetris, Thakuris, and Sanyasis (Dashnami) who are citizens of Nepal should be considered as Khas Arya for electoral purposes.

Historically, Khas were the speakers of an ancient Khasa language from the Indo-Aryan language family and the earliest recorded speakers of the Western Pahari languages. The large portion of the Indo-Aryan speakers throughout lower Himalayas were the Masto people. An intrusion of this tribe from the Western and Northwestern Himalayas into Central Himalayas is substantiated by the early linguistic evidences related to the Nepali language. They were also known as Parbatiyas/Parbates and are currently known as Paharis/Pahadis. (literally, "from the hills"). They were also referred to as Yartse in Tibet and are also known as Khasan by Bhotia people. The term Khas has now become obsolete, as the Khas people have adopted communal identities because of the negative stereotypes associated with the term Khas. In Nepal the native speakers of the Nepali language are known as Khas people.

== Origin ==
=== Indo-Aryan origin theories ===
They have been connected to the Khasas mentioned in the ancient Hindu literature. Irish linguist Sir G.A. Grierson asserted that "..the great mass of the Aryan speaking population of the lower Himalaya from Kashmir to Darjeeling is inhabited by tribes descended from the ancient Khasas of Mahabharata." Historian Bal Krishna Sharma and Dor Bahadur Bista speculates that the Khas people were of Indo-European origin. Historian Baburam Acharya speculates that Khas are a sub-clan of Aida, an "Aryas” clan that originated at Idavritt (modern day Kashmir to Nepal). (Note: Historian Baburam Acharya speculates that in the 3rd millennium BCE., there were two clans of Arya in the northern Indian subcontinent; Aiḍa and Mānava. Aiḍa who were named after their homeland Iḍavritt (modern day Kashmir), settled over Panjab and Ganga-Jamuna plain while Mānava settled over Awadh region. Chandravanshi kings like Bharata and Yudhisthir belonged to Aiḍa while Suryavanshi kings like Ramachandra belonged to Mānava. Later, Aiḍa built dominion over Magadh while Mānava had dominion over Videha.) Khas were living in the Idavaritt in the 3rd millennium BCE. and the original meaning of the term Khas was Raja or Kshatriya (Yoddha). He further speculates that Kashmir has been named from its local residents Khas as Khasmir. In the 2nd millennium BCE, one group of Khas migrated towards Iran while the other group migrated east of Sutlej river settling only in the hill regions up to Bheri River. Historian Balkrishna Pokhrel contends that Khas were not the Vedic Aryans but Aryans of the latter periods like the Gurjara, Darada, Shaka, and Pallava. He further asserts that post-Vedic Aryans were akin to Vedic Aryans in terms of language and culture. Irish linguist Sir George Abraham Grierson asserted that the Khasas were one of the warrior "Kshatriya tribe of Aryan origin" with linguistic connections to both Sanskrit and Iranian languages, who lost claim to Vedichood due to non-observance of Vedic rules. (Note: ...in the extreme northwest of India, on the Hindu Kush and mountainous tracts to the south, and in Western Punjab, there was a group of tribes, one of which was called Khasa, which were looked upon as Kshatriyas of Aryan origin. These spoke a language closely allied with Sanskrit, but with a vocabulary partly agreeing with that of the Eranian Avesta. They were considered to have lost their claim to considerations as Aryans, and to have become Mlechhas, or barbarians, owing to their non-observance of the rules for drinking and eating by Sanskritic peoples of India. Khasas were warlike tribe, and were well known to classical writers, who noted, as their special home, the Indian Caucasus of Pliny.) Roman geographer Pliny the Elder described the ancient Khasas/Khasiras (referred as 'Casiri') as one of the Indian ethnicity.

=== Saka origin theories ===
Historian Rahul Sankrityayan proposes the origin of the Khasha tribe from the Shaka tribe and further identifies Khashas and Shakas to have been two different waves of the same race. The Shakas were in Indian subcontinent before the first century BCE while the Khashas spread over the Himalayas and extensively populated the mountainous regions of Uttarakhand and the later waves of Shakas got diffused into them. Historian Omchand Handa contends that the "sun worship" among Khashas is a Shaka legacy and perhaps the standing Surya images with long boots which was commonly found at the Khasha belt of Himalaya. Some examples of it are the Bara-Aditya at Katarmal and Surya images of Baijnath, Bageshwar and Dwarahat.

== History ==
=== Medieval history in Nepal and Uttarakhand ===
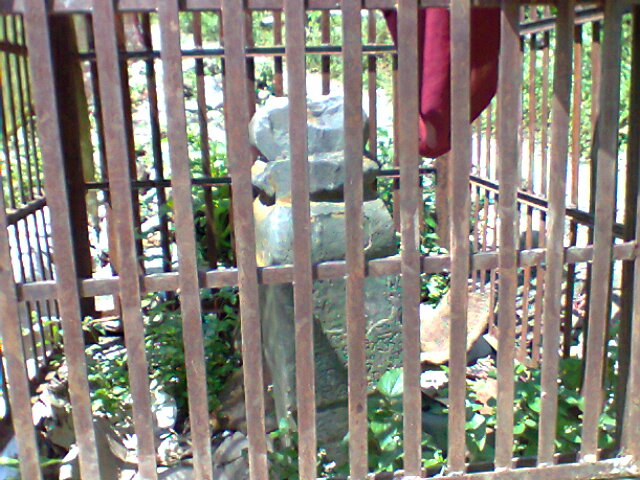
Stone script of Damupal near Kartikhamba in Dailekh dated 1038 (981 AD) is claimed to be the first stone script in Nepali Language.

Khasas are believed to have arrived in the western reaches of Nepal at the beginning of first-millennium B.C. or middle of first-millennium A.D. from the north-west. The earliest linguistic evidences related to Nepali language also substantiates the linguistic intrusion of an Indo-Aryan speaking Khasa tribe from the West or Northwest Himalayas into Central Himalayas at the present day regions of Western Nepal. It is likely that they absorbed people from different ethnic groups during this immigration. They had extensively populated the mountainous regions of Uttarakhand and they had entirely dominated the inner Himalayan belt up to Nepal. Previously, Khashas had strongly established themselves from Afghanistan to Nepal from ancient period and as per internal evidences, they managed the village level theocratic republics like Gram-Rajya and Mandals under various local clans and identities.

The ruling Katyuri dynasty (700-1065 CE) of Kumaon who were of Khas origin, was one of the ruling houses of Joshimath that claimed the sovereignty over other Gram Rajyas of the entire territory. The Katyuris ruled from Joshimath in the Alaknanda Valley and later they shifted their capital to Baijnath. They have also been connected to the medieval Khasa Malla kingdom. The Khasa kings of West Nepal-Uttarakhand formed the famous Malla Kingdom, which ruled Humla from the eleventh century before collapsing and splintering into local chiefdoms during the fourteenth century. In the initial phase, majority of Khas people became Brahmins and others became Kshatriyas.

=== History in Kashmir ===
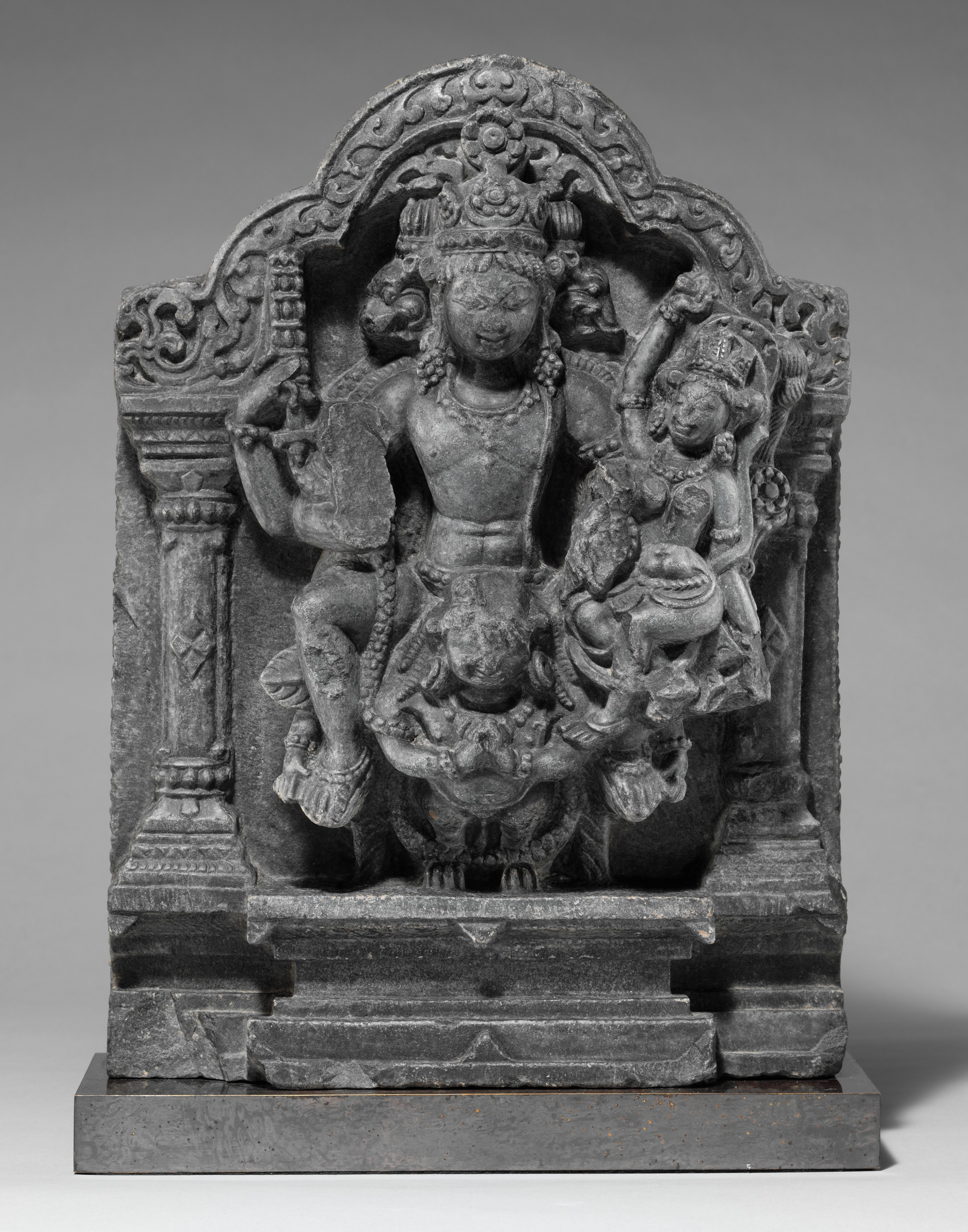
Vishnu and Lakshmi Garuda art at the time of the Khasha Lohara dynasty, 11th century CE, Jammu and Kashmir.

The ruling Lohara dynasty (1003-1320 CE) of Kashmir were from the Khas tribe as per the 12th century text Rajatarangini written by the local Kashmiri Pandit historian Kalhana. Furthermore, Rajatarangini describes the rulers of Rajapuri (modern Rajauri) as the "lord of the Khasas". The Khasa chiefs of Rajapuri freely intermarried with Kshatriya rulers of Kashmir while the Khasa chief of Lohara, Simharaja, married a daughter of Shahi Kings of Kabul. The descendants of the royal family of Rajauri later became Muslim Rajput chiefs and they retained the rulership of the territory till 19th century. The inhabitants of Karnah region in northwestern Kashmir, were Khasas and they were represented by the modern Bomba (tribe) who independently ruled the northwestern Kashmir till the Sikh conquest of Kashmir. There was also an independent Khasa lord at the castle located in the foot of Banahal Pass in the territory of Visalata and Dengapala ("Thakkura Dengapala") was a Khasa chief at the banks of Chandrabhaga (modern Chenab river).

=== Modern history in Nepal ===
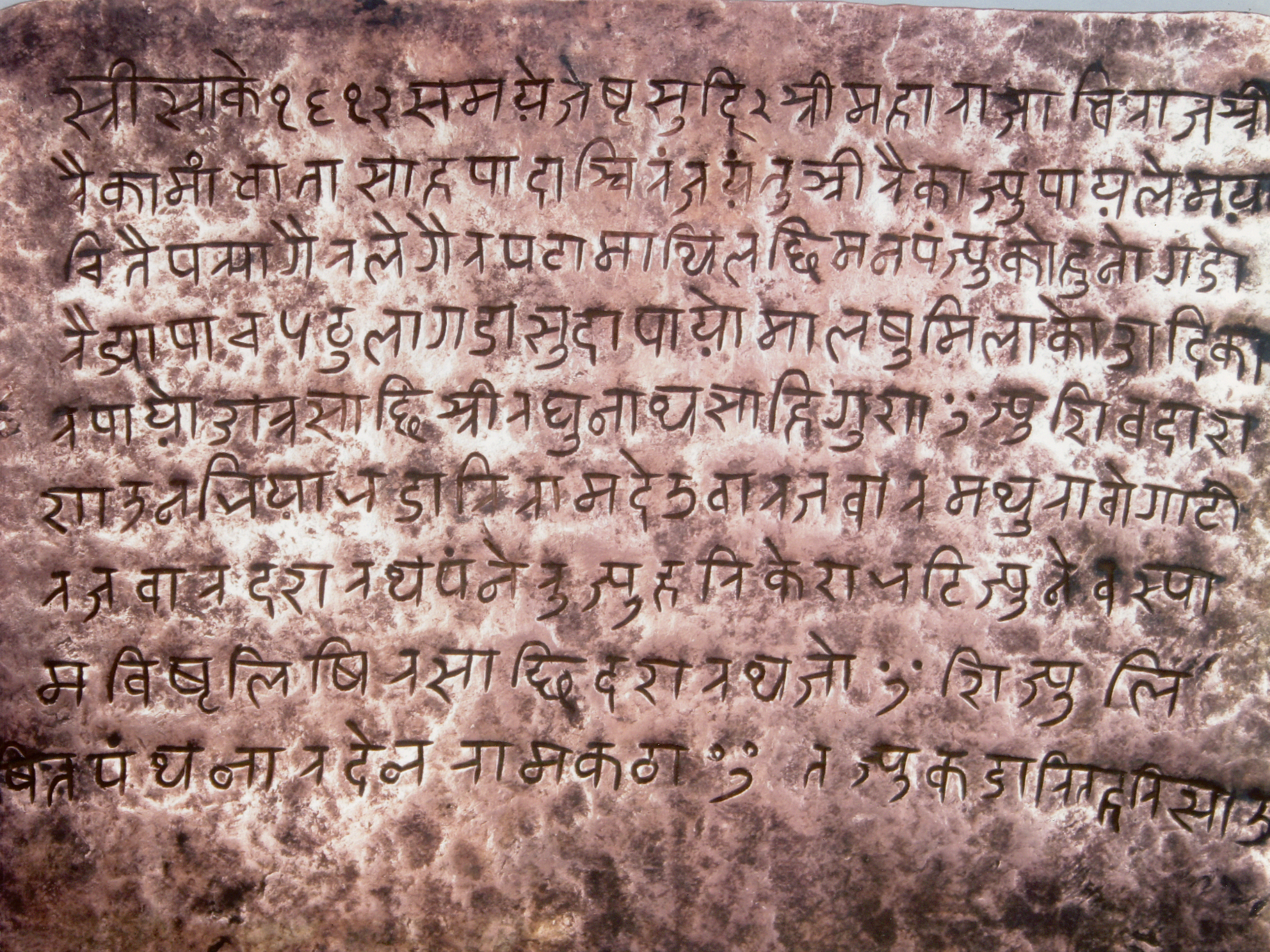
Copper Inscription by King of Doti, Raika Mandhata Shahi at Saka Era 1612 (शाके १६१२; 1747 Bikram Samvat (c. 1690 – 1691) in old Khas language using Devanagari script

Until the 19th century, the Gorkhali referred to their country as Khas Desh (Khas country). As they annexed the various neighboring countries (such as Nepal or Newa of the Newar people) to the Gorkha kingdom, the terms such as Khas and Newar ceased to be used as the names of countries. The 1854 legal code (Muluki Ain), promulgated by the Nepali Prime Minister Jung Bahadur Rana, himself a Khas, no longer referred to Khas as a country, rather as a jāt (species or community) within the Gorkha kingdom.

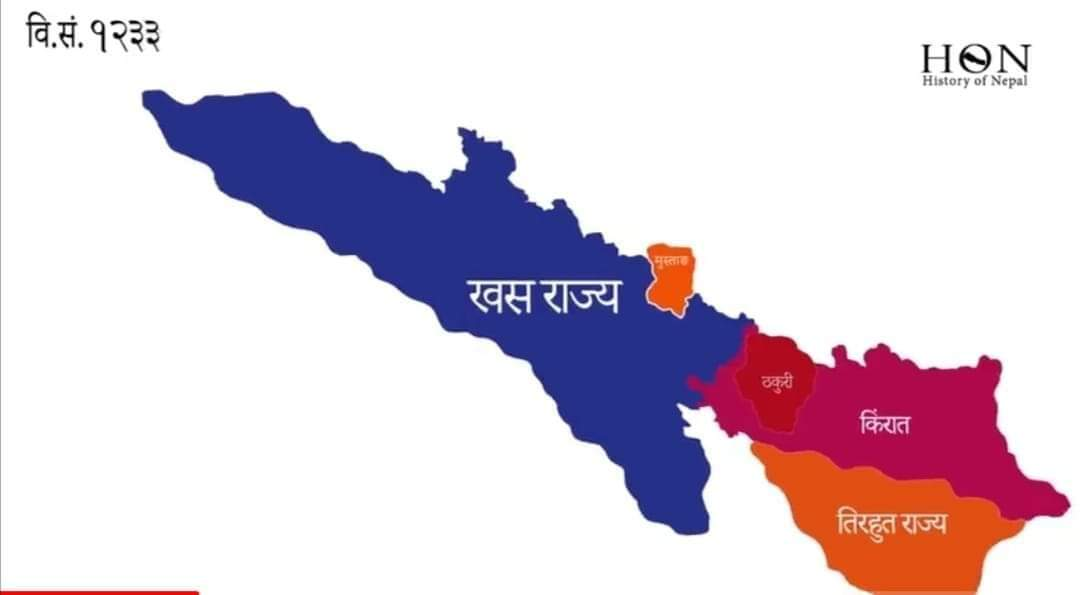
Khas Kingdom

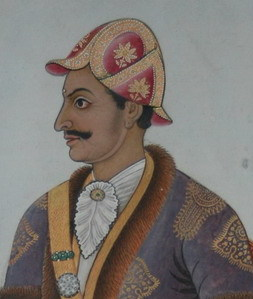
Mukhtiyar Bhimsen Thapa, the widely accepted first Prime Minister of Nepal

The Shah dynasty of the Gorkha Kingdom, as well as the later prime-ministerial Rana dynasty, spoke the Khas language (now called the Nepali language). However, they claimed to be Rajputs of western Indian origin, rather than the native Khas Kshatriyas. Since outside Nepal, the Khas social status was seen as inferior to that of the Rajputs, the rulers started describing themselves as natives of the Hill country, rather than that of the Khas country. Most people, however, considered the terms Khas and Parbatiya (Pahari/Pahadi or Hill people) as synonymous.

Jung Bahadur also re-labeled the Khas jāt as Chhetri in present-day Nepal. Originally, the Brahmin immigrants from the plains considered the Khas as low-caste because of the latter's neglect of high-caste taboos (such as alcohol abstinence). The upper-class Khas people commissioned the Bahun (Brahmin) priests to initiate them into the high-caste Chhetri order and adopted high-caste manners. Other Khas families who could not afford to (or did not care to) pay the Bahun priests also attempted to assume the Chhetri status but were not recognized as such by others. They are now called Matwali (alcohol-drinker Khas) Chhetris. Because of the adoption of the Chhetri identity, the term Khas is rapidly becoming obsolete. According to Dor Bahadur Bista (1991), "the Khas have vanished from the ethnographic map of Nepal".

== Modern ==
=== Nepal ===
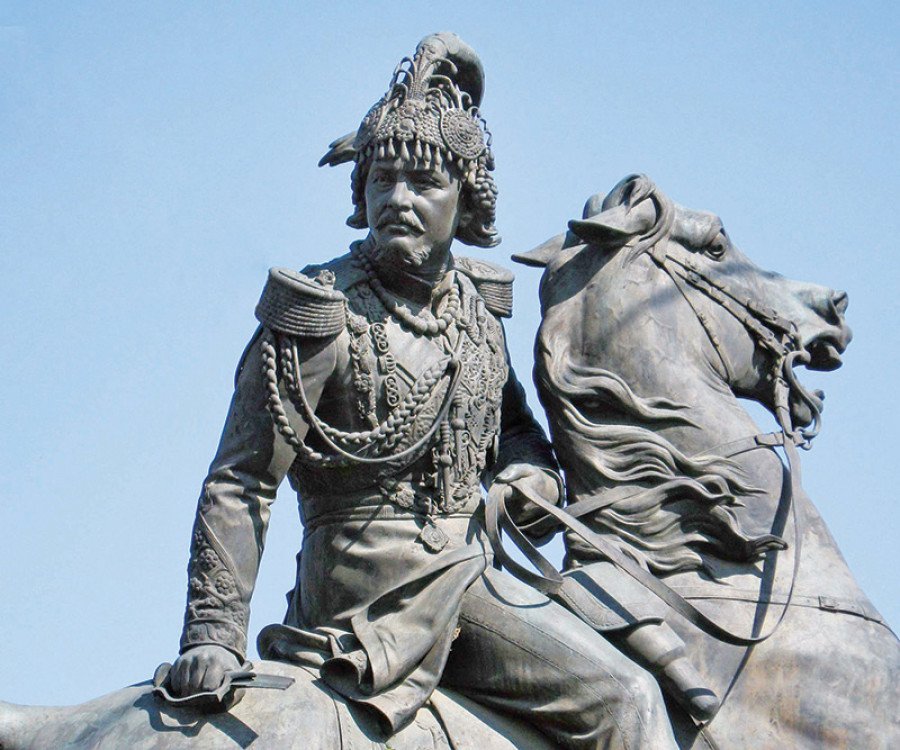
Jang Bahadur Rana, de-facto ruler of Nepal and a patriarch of historical Rana dynasty (1846-1951)

Modern-day Khas people are referred to as Hill Brahmin (Bahun), Hill Kshatriya (Thakuri/Chhetri) and Hill Dalit. Further, historian Pokharel adds the Gharti, Damai, Kami, Sarki, Hudka, Tamote, Gaine and Badi to the Khas communities. In modern times, Khas people are popularly referred by the term "Khas Arya".

=== India-Pakistan ===
In Kumaon and Garhwal regions of Uttarakhand in India, too, the term Khas has become obsolete. The Khas people of Kumaon termed as Kumaoni khash jimdar, after being elevated to the Rajput status by the Chand kings. During Chand rule in Kumaon, Khas and Rajput were differentiated by their sacred thread, Khas were allowed to wear only 3 thread (3 palli)sacred thread whereas Rajput used to wear 6 palli sacred thread.The term Khas is almost obsolete, and people resent being addressed as Khas because of the negative stereotypes associated with this term. Furthermore, the Kanets of Kangra and Garhwal, Khasa of Jaunsar-Bawar and the bulk population of Garhwal and Kumaon (referred as "Khasia") are descended from the Khasas. Generally, the Khas people are referred as Rajputs or Kanets in the Himachal Pradesh. According to E.T. Atkinson, the Jaunsar-Bawar is the representative Khasiya tract and it

"..forms a very important links between the almost Hinduized Khasiyas of Kumaon and their brethren converts to Islam on the ethnical frontier of the mountains of Hindu Kush and apparently gives customs and practices of Khasiya race in full force at the present day which distinguished them thousands of years ago."

Historian Sir Marc Aurel Stein identified the modern Khakha Rajputs of Azad Kashmir as the descendants of Khasas mentioned in the Rajatarangini. The Khasa tribe in Karnah region in northwestern Kashmir were represented by the modern Bomba (tribe).

== Communities ==
Historian Balkrishna Pokhrel writes the communities or caste in Khas group were hill Bahun, Chhetri, Thakuri, Gharti, Damai, Kami, Sarki, Hudka, Tamote, Gaine and Sunar, badi, luhar, parki etc . The tribal designation Khas refers to in some contexts only to the alcohol drinker Khas group, i.e. Thakuri and Chhetri, but in other contexts may also include the low status (occupational Khas groups such as Kāmi (blacksmiths), Damāi (tailors), and Sārki (shoemakers and leather workers). Khas people are addressed with the term Khayan or Parbatiya or Partyā, Parbaté meaning hill-dweller by Newars. The hill Khas tribe are in large part associated with the Gorkhali warriors.

Khas people of the Western Himalayas are considered similar to the Khas people of the Garhwal, Kumaon and Nepal. They are generally referred as Rajputs or Kanets in the Himachal Pradesh. The Khasas of Jaunsar-Bawar who are represented by the Jaunsari Rajputs and Brahmins) practiced polyandrous marriages.

== Culture and religion ==
=== Languages ===
Irish Linguist George Abraham Grierson in his Linguistic Survey of India stated that the Khas tribe were the earliest recorded speakers of the Western Pahari languages. He further asserted that the Khas people made the bulk population of the Indo-Aryan speakers throughout the lower Himalaya from Kashmir to Darjeeling.

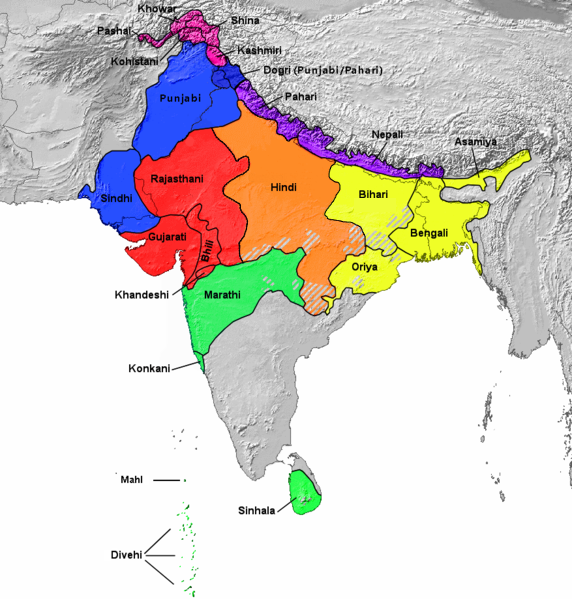
Khasa language of Nepal, belongs to the Northern Indo-Aryan language group as shown as Nepali, in dark purple

The Khas people of Nepal originally referred to their language as Khas kurā (Khas speech), which was also known as Parbatiya (the language of the hill country). The Newar people used the term Khayan Bhaya, Parbatiya and Gorkhali as a name for this language, Gorkhalis themselves started using this term to refer to their language at a later stage. In an attempt to disassociate himself with his Khas past, the Rana prime minister Jung Bahadur decreed that the term Gorkhali be used instead of Khas kurā to describe the language. Meanwhile, the British Indian administrators had started using the term Nepal (after Newar) to refer to the Gorkha kingdom. In the 1930s, the Gorkha government also adopted this term to describe their country. Subsequently, the Khas language also came to be known as Nepali language. It has become a national language of Nepal and lingua franca among the majority of population of Northern region of West Bengal, Sikkim and Bhutan. Historian Balkrishna Pokhrel contends that the Khas language of Nepal belonged to neither the Iranian language family, nor the Indian languages, but to the mid Indo-Iranian languages.

=== Music ===
Deuda song and folk dance performed on the occasion of various festivals in the Sudurpashchim and Karnali provinces of Nepal.

=== Religion ===
The majority of Khas profess Hinduism; some of them also follow Buddhism and some were also converted to Christianity. The Khas people also had their own sect of Shaivism known as Masto religion where 12 Masto gods were worshipped. These gods were said to be sons of Shiva. Masto worship was prevalent throughout all of the Western Himalayan region.

== Notable people ==
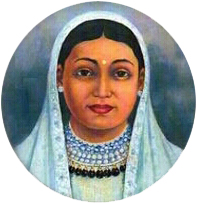
Portrait of a Khas 'Queen Tripurasundari of Nepal', who ruled the country as a Queen regent in the 19th century

=== Medieval Khas families and dynasties ===
- Katyuri kings
- Lohara dynasty
- Gurkha Kingdom
- Vanshala Kingdom
- Vishlata

=== Modern Khas ===
- Bir Bhadra Thapa
- Sanukaji Amar Singh Thapa
- Bhimsen Thapa
- Jung Bahadur Rana
- Kalu Pande (Kaji)
- BP Koirala
- Bhanubhakta Acharya
- Prithvi Narayan Shah
- Shivaram Singh Basnyat (Badabir senapanti)
- Kehar Singh Basnyat
- Damodar Pandey
- Abhiman Singh Basnyat
- Kirtiman Singh Basnyat
- Bakhtawar Singh Basnyat
- Dhokal Singh Basnyat
- Rana Jang Pande
- Kunwar Inderjit Singh
- Subarna Shamsher Rana
- Sher Bahadur Thapa
- Surya Bahadur Thapa
- Jhalak Man Gandarbha

== See also ==
- Nepali language
- Kumaoni language
- Garhwali language
- Indo-Aryan migrations

== Works cited ==
- Acharya, Baburam (1975), Bhandari, Devi Prasad (ed.), "Itihas Kaalbhanda Pahile" (PDF), Purnima, 8 (1), Kathmandu, archived from the original (PDF) on 2024-05-13
- Bista, Dor Bahadur (1991). Fatalism and Development: Nepal's Struggle for Modernization. Orient Blackswan. ISBN 978-81-250-0188-1.
- Burghart, Richard (1984). "The Formation of the Concept of Nation-State in Nepal". The Journal of Asian Studies. 44 (1): 101–125. doi:10.2307/2056748. JSTOR 2056748. S2CID 154584368.
- "Nepal's election may at last bring stability". The Economist. 23 November 2017.
- Ghimire, Yubaraj (2 April 2018). "Next Door Nepal: Another chink in the wall". Indian Express.
- Grierson, George Abraham (1916). Linguistic Survey of India, Volume 9, Part 4. Vol. 9. Office of the superintendent of government printing, India.
- Hagen, Toni; Thapa, Deepak (1998). Toni Hagen's Nepal: The Kingdom in the Himalaya. Himal Books.
- Handa, O. C. (Omacanda) (2002). History of Uttaranchal. New Delhi: Indus Publishing. ISBN 9788173871344.
- Hitchcock, John T (1978). "An Additional Perspective on the Nepali Caste System". In James F. Fisher (ed.). Himalayan Anthropology: The Indo-Tibetan Interface. Walter de Gruyter. ISBN 978-90-279-7700-7.
- Jain, Danesh; Cardona, George (26 July 2007). The Indo-Aryan Languages. Routledge. ISBN 9781135797119.
- "PM briefs international community". The Kathmandu Post. 28 March 2018.
- Kuronuma, Yuji (6 July 2017). "Nepal seeks unity from its first local elections in 20 years". Nikkei Asian Review.
- Mulmi, Amish Raj (13 June 2017). "Lessons for India From Nepal's History of Banning Cow Slaughter". The Wire.
- "Quotable quota". Nepali Times. 23 March 2018.
- Northey, William Brook; Morris, C. J. (1928). The Gurkhas: Their Manners, Customs, and Country. Asian Educational Services. ISBN 978-81-206-1577-9.
- Paudel, Shreya (7 April 2018). "What does high caste chauvinism look like?". The Kathmandu Post.
- Pokhrel, Balkrishna (1 December 1973) [1962], "Ancient Khas Culture" (PDF), Regmi Research Series, 5 (12): 229–236, archived from the original (PDF) on 2024-06-25
- Pradhan, Kumar L. (2012), Thapa Politics in Nepal: With Special Reference to Bhim Sen Thapa, 1806–1839, New Delhi: Concept Publishing Company, p. 278, ISBN 9788180698132
- Saklani, Dinesh Prasad (1998). Ancient Communities of the Himalaya. Indus Publishing. ISBN 9788173870903.
- Saksena, R.N. (2019). "Marriages and Family in the Polyandrous Khasa tribe of Jaunsar-Bawar". In George Kurrian (ed.). The Family in India: A Regional View. Walter de Gruyter. pp. 108–118. ISBN 9783110886757.
- Sharma, Bal Krishna (1999). The origin of caste system in Hinduism and its relevance in the present context. Indian Society for Promoting Christian Knowledge and Samdan Publishers. ISBN 9788172144968.
- Sharma, Manorma (1998). Tribal Melodies of Himachal Pradesh: Gaddi folk music. APH Publishing. ISBN 9788170249122.
- Sharma, Megha (2019), "The region of Kashmir in Ancient Literature with special mention to Tribes" (PDF), Pramana Research Journal, 9 (6): 703–707, ISSN 2249-2976
- Stein, Mark Aurel (1989) [1900]. Kalhana's Rajatarangini: a chronicle of the kings of Kasmir, Volume 2 (Reprinted ed.). Motilal Banarsidass. ISBN 978-81-208-0370-1.
- Singh, K. S. (2005). People of India: Uttar Pradesh. Anthropological Survey of India. ISBN 978-81-7304-114-3.
- Thakur, Laxman S. (1990). "The Khasas An Early Indian Tribe". In K. K. Kusuman (ed.). A Panorama of Indian Culture: Professor A. Sreedhara Menon Felicitation Volume. Mittal Publications. pp. 285–293. ISBN 978-81-7099-214-1.
- Thieme, Susan (2006). Social Networks and Migration: Far West Nepalese Labour Migrants in Delhi. LIT Verlag Münster. ISBN 978-3-8258-9246-3.
- Whelpton, John (2005). A History of Nepal. Cambridge University Press. ISBN 978-0521804707.
