= Karnah Assembly constituency =

Constituency of the Jammu and Kashmir legislative assembly in India

Coordinates: 34.39°N 73.84°E

Karnah
- Constituency No. 1 for the Jammu and Kashmir Legislative Assembly

Constituency details
- Country: India
- Region: North India
- Union Territory: Jammu and Kashmir
- Division: Kashmir
- District: Kupwara
- Lok Sabha constituency: Baramulla
- Established: 1962

Member of Legislative Assembly
- 13th Jammu and Kashmir Legislative Assembly
- Incumbent Javaid Ahmad Mirchal
- Party: Jammu and Kashmir National Conference
- Elected year: 2024

Karnah Assembly constituency is one of the 90 constituencies in the Jammu and Kashmir Legislative Assembly of Jammu and Kashmir a north union territory of India. Karnah is also part of Baramulla Lok Sabha constituency.

Till the delimitation, which was undertaken in 2022, it was one of the 87 constituencies in Jammu and Kashmir State.

== Members of the Legislative Assembly ==
Year	Member	Party
1962	Mohammed Yunis Khan	Jammu & Kashmir National Conference
1967	Mohammed Yunis Khan	Indian National Congress
1972	Mohammed Yaseen Shah	Independent
1977	Ghulam Qadir Mir	Jammu & Kashmir National Conference
1983	Abdul Gani Lone	Jammu and Kashmir People's Conference
1987	Sharifuddin Shariq	Jammu & Kashmir National Conference
1996	Kafil-ur-Rehman	Jammu & Kashmir National Conference
2002	Kafil-ur-Rehman	Jammu & Kashmir National Conference
2008	Kafil-ur-Rehman	Jammu & Kashmir National Conference
2014	Raja Manzoor Ahmad	Jammu & Kashmir People's Democratic Party
2024	Javaid Ahmad Mirchal	Jammu and Kashmir National Conference

== Election results ==
=== Assembly Election 2024 ===
2024 Jammu and Kashmir Legislative Assembly election : Karnah
Party	Candidate	Votes	%	±%
JKNC	Javaid Ahmad Mirchal	14,294	34.59%	New
JKPC	Naseer Ahmad Awan	8,032	19.44%	▲10.33
JKPDP	Firdous Ahmad Mir	6,354	15.38%	▼32.37
JKAP	Raja Manzoor Ahmad	5,151	12.47%	New
BJP	Mohammed Idrees	2,973	7.20%	▲4.67
Independent	Fayaz Ahmad	2,925	7.08%	New
SP	Sajawal Shah	735	1.78%	New
NOTA	None of the Above	464	1.12%	▲0.18
Margin of victory		6,262	15.15%	▼7.13
Turnout		41,320	71.30%	▼6.90
Registered electors		57,951		▲74.91
JKNC gain from JKPDP		Swing	▼13.15	

=== Assembly Election 2014 ===
2014 Jammu and Kashmir Legislative Assembly election : Karnah
Party	Candidate	Votes	%	±%
JKPDP	Raja Manzoor Ahmad	12,371	47.75%	▲35.55
JKNC	Kifil-Ur-Rehman Khan	6,596	25.46%	▲6.30
INC	Ali Asgar Khan	2,894	11.17%	▲0.71
JKPC	Mohammad Saleem Mir	2,359	9.10%	New
BJP	Ishfaq Ur Rehman	654	2.52%	New
JKNPP	Jahangir Khan	453	1.75%	New
All J & K Kisan Majdoor Party	Aijaz Ahmad Badana	339	1.31%	New
NOTA	None of the Above	244	0.94%	New
Margin of victory		5,775	22.29%	▲16.94
Turnout		25,910	78.20%	▼1.45
Registered electors		33,132		▲22.98
JKPDP gain from JKNC		Swing	▲28.59	

=== Assembly Election 2008 ===
2008 Jammu and Kashmir Legislative Assembly election : Karnah
Party	Candidate	Votes	%	±%
JKNC	Kafil-ur-Rehman	4,110	19.15%	▼26.86
JKANC	Abdul Rehman Bhadana	2,962	13.80%	New
Socialist Democratic Party (India)	Javaid Ahmad Mirchal	2,911	13.57%	New
Independent	Ali Asgar Khan	2,642	12.31%	New
JKPDP	Raja Manzoor Ahmad	2,616	12.19%	New
INC	Syed Yasin Shah	2,245	10.46%	▼25.05
Independent	Mohammed Abass	1,708	7.96%	New
Margin of victory		1,148	5.35%	▼5.16
Turnout		21,458	79.65%	▲14.28
Registered electors		26,941		▼6.93
JKNC hold		Swing	▼26.86	

=== Assembly Election 2002 ===
2002 Jammu and Kashmir Legislative Assembly election : Karnah
Party	Candidate	Votes	%	±%
JKNC	Kifil-Ur-Rehman Khan	8,707	46.02%	▼16.17
INC	Mohammed Sikander Khan	6,719	35.51%	▲22.66
Independent	Abdul Rashid Mirchal	2,117	11.19%	New
BJP	Manzoor Ahmad	749	3.96%	New
Independent	Jehangir Khan	282	1.49%	New
Independent	Ali Haider	214	1.13%	New
Independent	Showqat Hussain Beigh	134	0.71%	New
Margin of victory		1,988	10.51%	▼26.72
Turnout		18,922	65.37%	▲0.61
Registered electors		28,948		▲8.55
JKNC hold		Swing	▼16.17	

=== Assembly Election 1996 ===
1996 Jammu and Kashmir Legislative Assembly election : Karnah
Party	Candidate	Votes	%	±%
JKNC	Kifil-Ur-Rehman Khan	10,739	62.19%	▲11.31
JD	Abdul Rahman Badana	4,311	24.96%	New
INC	Mohammed Sikander Khan	2,219	12.85%	New
Margin of victory		6,428	37.22%	▲23.61
Turnout		17,269	66.07%	▼10.04
Registered electors		26,667		▼49.93
JKNC hold		Swing		

=== Assembly Election 1987 ===
1987 Jammu and Kashmir Legislative Assembly election : Karnah
Party	Candidate	Votes	%	±%
JKNC	Sharifuddin Shariq	20,269	50.88%	▲5.88
JKNC	Abdul Rashid Mirchl	14,844	37.26%	▼7.74
Independent	Amir-Ud Din	3,570	8.96%	New
Independent	Mohammed Yaqoob	399	1.00%	New
Independent	Ghulam Qadir Mir	364	0.91%	New
Margin of victory		5,425	13.62%	▲4.23
Turnout		39,839	77.02%	▲3.66
Registered electors		53,262		▲10.66
JKNC hold		Swing	▲5.88	

=== Assembly Election 1983 ===
1983 Jammu and Kashmir Legislative Assembly election : Karnah
Party	Candidate	Votes	%	±%
JKNC	Abdul Gani Lone	15,407	45.00%	▼1.31
JKNC	Ghulam Qadir Mir	12,194	35.61%	▼10.70
INC	Mehboob Illahi	2,877	8.40%	▼20.23
JI	Mohammed Anwar	1,514	4.42%	New
Independent	Noorullah	925	2.70%	New
Independent	Gani Shiekh	537	1.57%	New
Independent	Ghulam Hassan	438	1.28%	New
Margin of victory		3,213	9.38%	▼8.29
Turnout		34,241	74.68%	▲6.62
Registered electors		48,131		▲16.37
JKNC hold		Swing	▼1.31	

=== Assembly Election 1977 ===
1977 Jammu and Kashmir Legislative Assembly election : Karnah
Party	Candidate	Votes	%	±%
JKNC	Ghulam Qadir Mir	12,357	46.31%	New
INC	Mohammed Yunis Khan	7,641	28.64%	▼11.54
JP	Ghulam Rasool Malik	5,868	21.99%	New
Margin of victory		4,716	17.67%	▲14.93
Turnout		26,684	67.94%	▼7.75
Registered electors		41,360		▲24.39
JKNC gain from Independent		Swing	▲3.40	

=== Assembly Election 1972 ===
1972 Jammu and Kashmir Legislative Assembly election : Karnah
Party	Candidate	Votes	%	±%
Independent	Mohammed Yaseen Shah	10,310	42.91%	New
INC	Mohammed Yunis Khan	9,652	40.17%	New
Independent	Abdul Rahman Dhana	4,065	16.92%	New
Margin of victory		658	2.74%	
Turnout		24,027	74.92%	▲72.26
Registered electors		33,250		▲12.98
Independent gain from INC		Swing		

=== Assembly Election 1967 ===
1967 Jammu and Kashmir Legislative Assembly election : Karnah
Party	Candidate	Votes	%	±%
INC	Mohammed Yunis Khan	Unopposed		
Registered electors		29,430		▲33.66
INC gain from JKNC		Swing		

=== Assembly Election 1962 ===
1962 Jammu and Kashmir Legislative Assembly election : Karnah
Party	Candidate	Votes	%	±%
JKNC	Mohammed Yunis Khan	Unopposed		
Registered electors		22,019		
JKNC win (new seat)				

== See also ==
- Karnah
- Kupwara district
- List of constituencies of the Jammu and Kashmir Legislative Assembly
