= Majhoi =

Majhoi مجہوئی
- Village
- Location within Azad Kashmir Location within Pakistan
- Coordinates: 34°15′N 73°35′E
- Country: Pakistan
- Territory: Azad Kashmir

Majhoi (also spelled Mujhoi; Urdu: مجہوئی) is a village in Azad Jammu and Kashmir, a polity of Kashmir that is administered by Pakistan. Majhoi sits 12 miles (19 km) south of Muzaffarabad, the territory's capital.

The Jhelum River runs through the village. It also served as the site for the construction of the Neelum-Jhelum hydropower project

The town gained significant media attention in October of 2007 following the crash of an escort helicopter for then-president Pervez Musharraf within the village. The four soldiers on board were killed; however, Musharraf was unhurt.
