= Sultan Khan =

Sultan Khan may refer to:

- Sultan Khan (chess player) (1903–1966), Pakistani chess player
- Sultan Khan (musician) (1940–2011), Indian sarangi player
- Sultan Mohammed Khan (1919–2010), Pakistani civil servant and British India Army officer
- Sultan Mohammad Khan (politician) (born 1980), Pakistani politician in Khyber Pakhtunkhwa
- Sultan Muzaffar Khan, founder of Muzaffarabad in Kashmir
- Sultan Said Khan, medieval ruler of East Turkestan
- Sultan Satuq Bughra Khan, Uyghur ruler

== See also ==
- Amet-khan Sultan, Crimean Tatar test pilot
- Kareem Rashad Sultan Khan, American soldier
