= Javaid Ahmad Mirchal =

Indian politician

Member of Jammu and Kashmir Legislative Assembly
- Incumbent
- Assumed office 8 October 2024
- Preceded by: Raja Manzoor Ahmad
- Constituency: Karnah

Personal details
- Political party: Jammu & Kashmir National Conference
- Profession: Politician

Javaid Ahmad Mirchal is an Indian politician from Jammu and Kashmir. He is a member of the Jammu and Kashmir Legislative Assembly from 2024, representing Karnah Assembly constituency as a member of the Jammu & Kashmir National Conference party.

== Electoral performance ==
Election	Constituency	Party	Result	Votes %	Opposition Candidate	Opposition Party	Opposition vote %	Ref
2024	Karnah	JKNC	Won	34.59%	Naseer Ahmad Awan	JKPC	19.44%	
2008	Karnah	Socialist Democratic Party (India)	Lost	13.57%	Kifil-Ur-Rehman Khan	JKNC	19.15%	

== See also ==
- 2024 Jammu and Kashmir Legislative Assembly election
- Jammu and Kashmir Legislative Assembly
