= Chitterkote =

- Village
- Location in Jammu and Kashmir Chitterkote (India)
- Coordinates: 34.371°N 73.799°E
- Country: India
- Union Territory: Jammu and Kashmir
- District: Kupwara
- Tehsil: Karnah

Languages
  - Official: Kashmiri, Hindi, Urdu, Dogri, English
- Time zone: UTC+5:30 (IST)
- PIN: 193225
- Vehicle registration: JK-09
- Website: kupwara.nic.in

Chitterkote is a small village in tehsil Karnah in Kupwara district in the Indian union territory of Jammu and Kashmir, a region disputed between India and Pakistan. The village is located 75 kilometres (47 mi) from district headquarters Kupwara and 8 kilometres (5.0 mi) from tehsil headquarters Tangdhar.

== Geography ==
The village covers about 2 km and is located 5 kilometres (3.1 mi) from the line of control between India and Pakistan. It is located in Karnah Valley between Chamkote and Gundi Syedian village just below Danna Mountain. It is in a remote area and remains isolated from Jammu and Kashmir for two months each winter due to avalanches at the Sadhna Pass and Shams Bri mountain ranges.

== Demographics ==
Chitterkote's population exceeds 1,200, with more than 129 houses. The village has a very healthy sex ratio of 997:1000. The village has a 30-bed hospital, a branch of Jammu and Kashmir Bank etc. The villagers are economically poor and less educated. The village population is mostly Pahari Muslims and some Pahari Sikhs.

=== Education ===
There is a Government Boys Middle School for boys and a separate school for girls as Government Girls Middle School. There are two privately run school known as New Light Public Model School and Karnah Valley Public school Chitterkote. The literacy rate of the village is below the national rate.

== Transportation ==
=== Air ===
The nearest airport is Srinagar International Airport located 170 kilometres from Chitterkote.

=== Rail ===
The nearest railway station is Baramulla railway station located 115 kilometres from Chitterkote.

=== Road ===
Chitterkote is connected to other places in Jammu and Kashmir and India by the NH 701 which passes through the Karnah tehsil.

== See also ==
- Teetwal
- Kupwara district
- Karnah
- Tangdhar
