= Punjkot =

Village in Azad Kashmir, Pakistan

Punjkot (Urdu: پنج کوٹ) also spelled Panjkot is a village (administrative subdivision of local government) in Muzaffarabad, Azad Kashmir, Pakistan.

It is located 50 kilometres (31 mi) from Muzaffarabad city. The village has population of 25,000 and is located on LOC.
