= Red Fort, Muzaffarabad =

16th-century fortification in Azad Jammu and Kashmir, Pakistan

Red Fort
- Rutta Qila
- Muzaffarabad, Azad Jammu and Kashmir
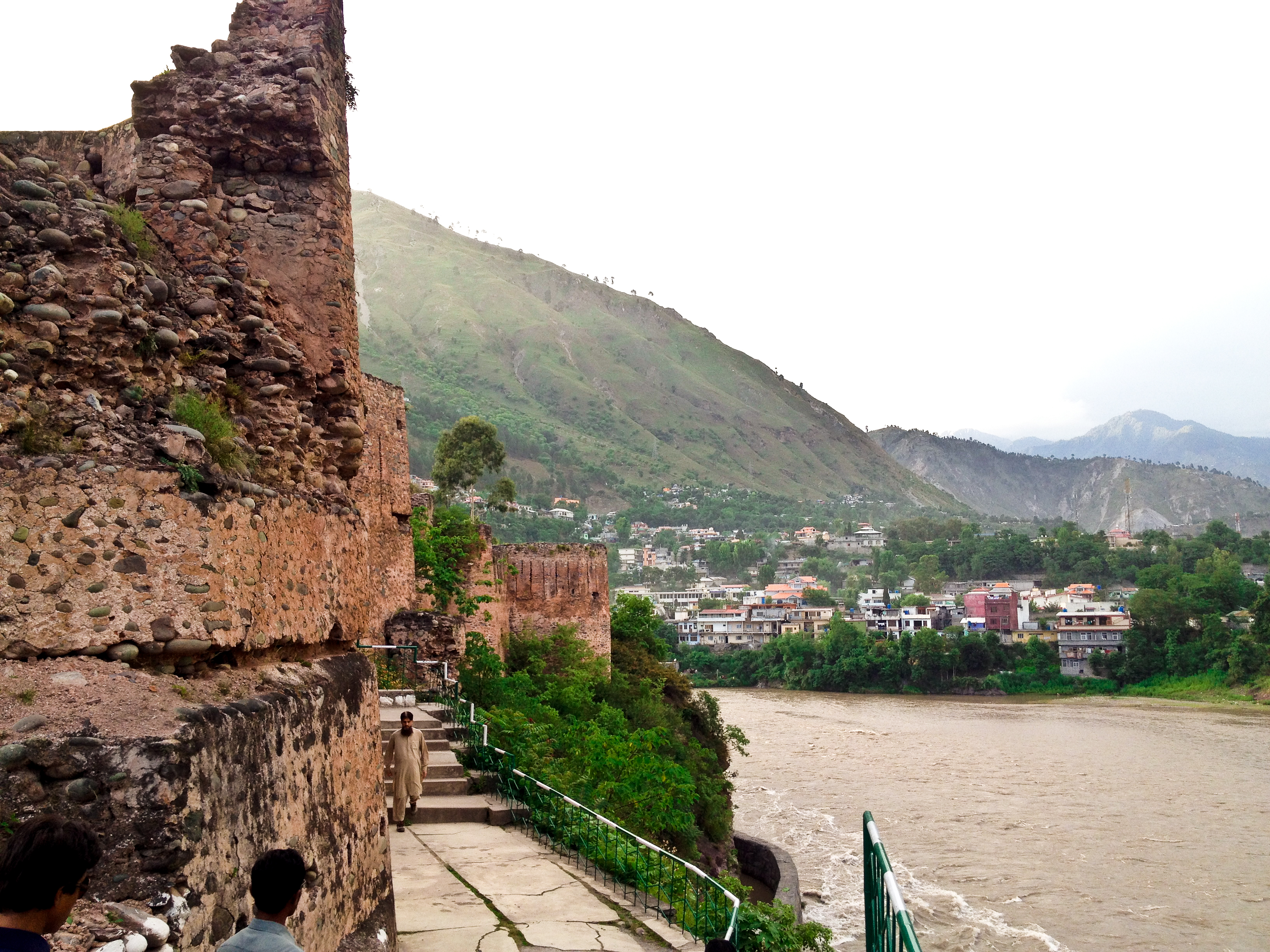
- Red Fort in 2014

Site information
- Type: Fortification
- Owner: AJK Tourism and Archeology Department
- Status: Decommissioned in 1947

Location
- Coordinates: 34°22′56.63″N 73°27′53.18″E

Site history
- Built: c. 1559-1646

Red Fort (Urdu: لال قلعہ), also known as Muzaffarabad Fort, is a 16th-century fortification located in Muzaffarabad, Azad Jammu and Kashmir, Pakistan Administered Kashmir. Its construction was started by the Chak dynasty of Kashmir in 1559 but it was only completed in 1646 by Sultan Muzaffar Khan, a local ruler and the founder of Muzaffarabad. The fort is locally referred to as the 'Rutta Qila' or just 'qila'.

== Construction and architecture ==
In the 16th century, Chak rulers of Kashmir anticipated a threat to the city from the Mughals. For defence, they started construction of the fort in 1559 at a strategic location on the west of Muzaffarabad. The Mughal Empire annexed Kashmir in 1587, and the fort lost its importance. Finally, the construction of the fort was completed in 1646 in the reign of Sultan Muzaffar Khan of the Bomba Dynasty, the founder of Muzaffarabad.

The architecture of the fort shows that great experts in design and structure participated in its construction. It is surrounded on three sides by the Neelum River (formerly known as the Kishan Ganga River). The northern part of the fort had terraces with steps leading to the bank of the river. The main gate on eastern side was very well protected from the hazards of flood waters, but some parts on the north side have suffered damage. There used to be an inn at the entrance to the fort, but only traces of that structure remain now.

== Abandonment ==
In 1846, Maharaja Gulab Singh of the Dogra dynasty began reconstruction and extension of the fort for political and military operations and his successor Maharaja Ranbir Singh completed the work. The Dogra military then used the fort till 1926, after which a new cantonment was built, leaving the red fort abandoned once again. Towards the middle of 1947, the Dogra forces left, leaving the fort abandoned.

== Damage ==
Most of the fort's relics in museum associated with it were stolen by raiders and dealers and a large portion was destroyed during the 2005 Kashmir earthquake.

== Renovation ==
Later in October 2019, Government of Azad Kashmir and Lahore Walled City Authority (LWCA) signed a memorandum of understanding (MoU) for restoration and conservation of Red Fort and other major heritage places in Azad Kashmir.

On his trip to Azad Kashmir in 2022, American ambassador in Pakistan Donald Blome visited the fort.

== See also ==
- List of cultural heritage sites in Azad Kashmir
- List of forts in Pakistan
