= Gharti =

Surname

Gharti is a surname found in Nepal. It belongs to Khas, Bhujel and Magar ethnicities. Notable people with the name include:

- Balaram Gharti Magar, former Defense Minister of Nepal
- Bimal Gharti Magar, Nepalese football player
- Chandra Prakash Gharti, Nepalese politician
- Jaypuri Gharti, Nepalese politician
- Onsari Gharti Magar, the first female speaker of Parliament of Nepal
