= Kafil-ur-Rehman =

Indian politician

Member of the Legislative Assembly
- Constituency: Karnah
- In office 2002–2008
- In office 2008–2013

Personal details
- Party: Jammu & Kashmir National Conference

Kafil-ur-Rehman is an Indian politician who served as an MLA from the Karnah Assembly constituency in Jammu and Kashmir. He is a member of Jammu & Kashmir National Conference. Kafil-ur-Rehman's political journey began in the 2002 Jammu and Kashmir Legislative Assembly elections, where he ran for office in the Karnah constituency and won, becoming an MLA. He contested again from the Karnah constituency in the 2008 assembly elections and secured a second term as an MLA.

== See also ==
- Jammu & Kashmir National Conference
- Karnah Assembly constituency
- Jammu and Kashmir Legislative Assembly
