= Raja Manzoor Ahmad =

Indian politician

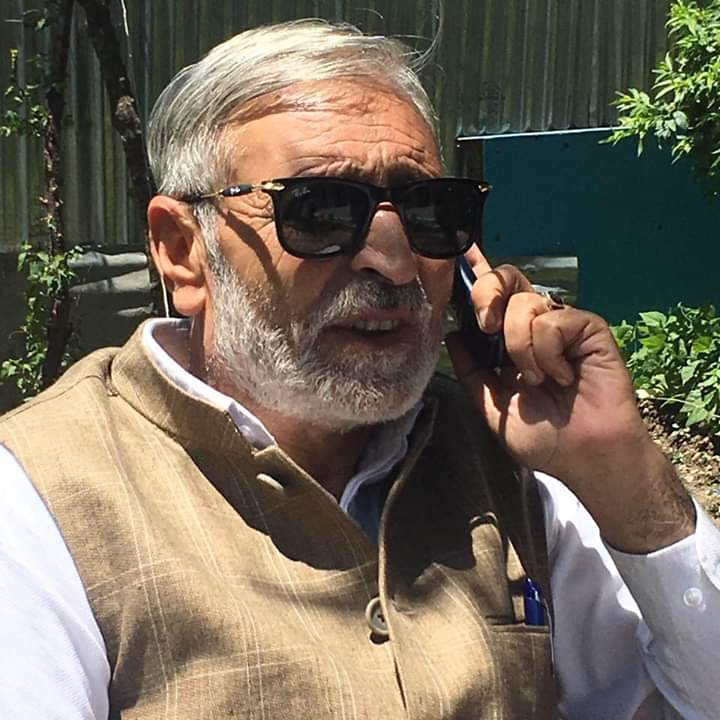

Raja Manzoor Ahmad Khan is an Indian politician who served as the Member of the Jammu and Kashmir Legislative Assembly from the Karnah constituency of the Kupwara district. He was a member of Peoples Democratic Party. He won general assembly elections 2014 with a huge margin. Before jumping into politics he served as public prosecutor in district court Kupwara. He ran a campaign for the construction of Sadhna Tunnel on Tangdar Kupwara Highway for an ease in commutation of the people residing in Karnah. He was expelled from PDP on January 9, 2020. He is the founding member of Jammu and Kashmir Apni Party and is currently serving as district president, Kupwara district.

== Electoral performance ==
| Election | Constituency | Party | Result | Votes % | Opposition Candidate | Opposition Party | Opposition vote % | Ref |
|---|---|---|---|---|---|---|---|---|
| 2024 | Karnah | JKAP | Lost | 12.47% | Javaid Ahmad Mirchal | JKNC | 34.59% | |
| 2014 | Karnah | JKPDP | Won | 47.75% | Kifil-Ur-Rehman Khan | JKNC | 25.46% | |
| 2008 | Karnah | JKPDP | Lost | 12.19% | Kifil-Ur-Rehman Khan | JKNC | 19.15% | |
