= Sultan Muzaffar Khan =

Kashmiri tribal chief

- Early 18th-century Mughal-style artwork depicting Muzaffar Khan

Sultan of Muzaffarabad
- Reign: 1646 – 9 September 1720
- Predecessor: Position established
- Successor: Habibat Khan
- Born: c. 1628; Kashmir Subah, Mughal Empire
- Died: 9 September 1720; Muzaffarabad, Kashmir Subah, Mughal Empire
- Burial: Muzaffarabad, Azad Kashmir, Pakistan
- Issue: Habibat Khan; Rehmat Khan
- Dynasty: Bomba

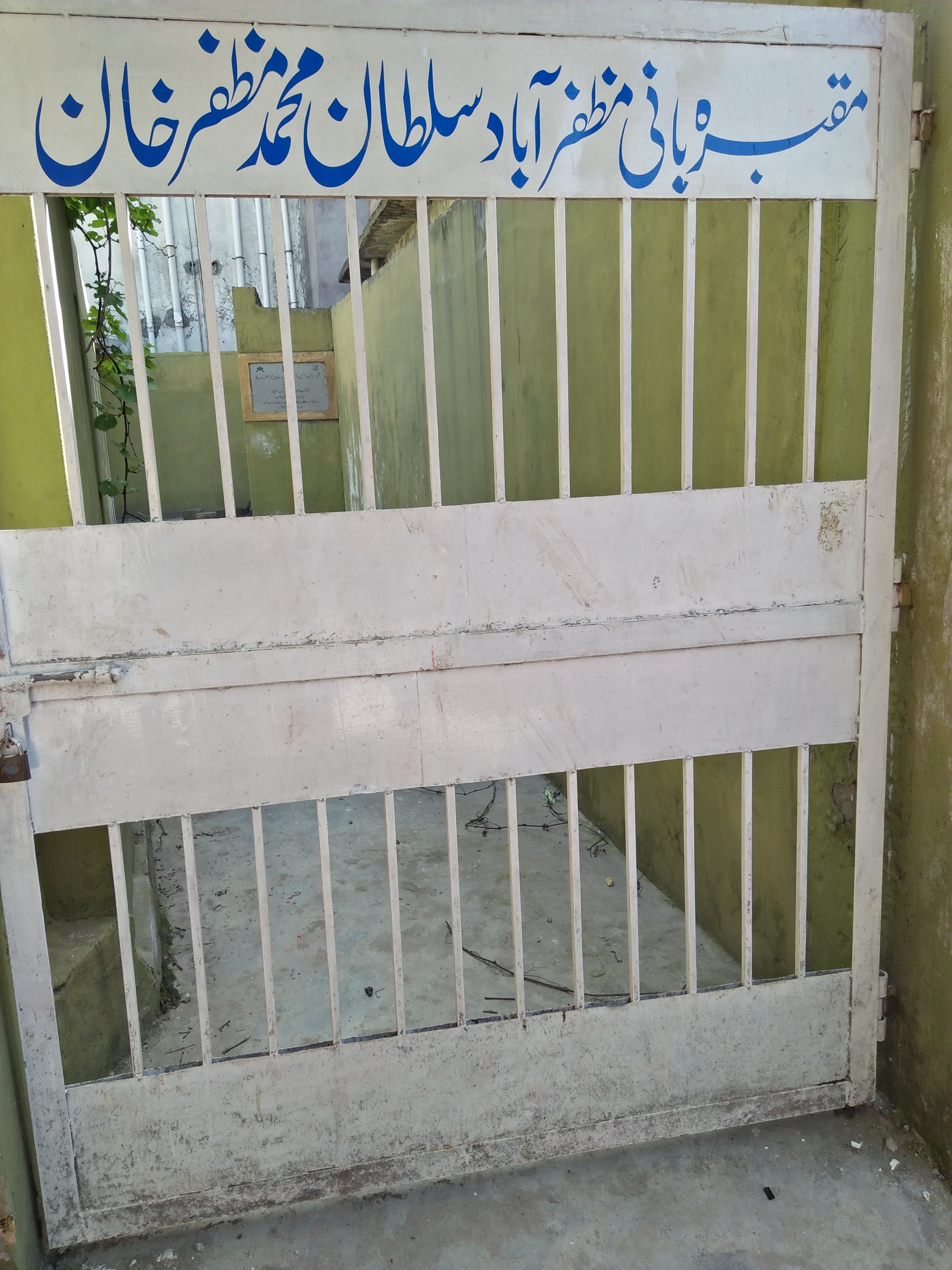
Tomb of Sultan Muzaffar Khan in Muzaffarabad, Azad Kashmir, Pakistan

Muhammad Muzaffar Khan Bomba (Persian: محمد مظفر خان بنبه) was a chief of the Bomba tribe who adopted the royal title of Sultan. He is the namesake and founder of the city of Muzaffarabad in present-day Azad Kashmir. Khan united various hill tribes near the Kashmir–Hazara border region and convinced them to settle near the site of two rivers: the Jhelum River and Neelum River.

Muzaffarabad was founded in 1646 by Sultan Muzaffar Khan, chief of the Bomba tribe who ruled Kashmir. Khan also constructed the Red Fort that same year for the purpose of warding off incursions from the Mughal Empire.

== Sources ==
- Delhi Sultans and Rajas 1300-1526
