= Socialist Democratic Party (India) =

Political Party

- Founded: 20 May 1959
- Dissolved: 10 December 1959

The Socialist Democratic Party was a short-lived political party in Andhra Pradesh, India. The SDP was founded on 20 May 1959 through the merger of the Democratic Party and the Socialist Unity Faction. The founding convention of the party took place in Tenali. A 37-member executive leadership was elected. Pusapati Vijayarama Gajapati Raju was elected as party chairman, Bommakanti Satyanarayana as general secretary and Marri Chenna Reddy as leader of the Legislature Party.

In total SDP counted 41 members of the Andhra Pradesh Legislative Assembly, 28 from the erstwhile Democratic Party, 12 socialist, and one dissident from the Praja Socialist Party. However, the different groups that had merged to form SDP continued to exist as distinct tendencies. In June 1959 the Swatantra Party was formed. The former Democratic Party assembly members deserted SDP and joined the Swatantra Party instead on 8 October 1959.

Latchanna and Chenna Reddy became leaders of the Andhra Pradesh unit of the Swatantra Party. P.V.G. continued to lead the rump SDP, which was joined by PSP assembly members (in total the party counted 15 assembly members at the time). Soon afterward, however, P.V.G. Raju and his associates in the assembly merged with the Indian National Congress. The Speaker of the Andhra Pradesh Legislative Assembly declared the SDP dissolved on 10 December 1959.
