= Khakha =

The Khakha is a Muslim Rajput tribe native to the Muzaffarabad district of Azad Kashmir, Pakistan.

== Sikh Empire ==
During the Sikh conquest of Kashmir, the Khakha and also the Bhamba tribe, occasionally ventured into the valley on looting expeditions and thus annoyed the Sikh invaders.

It is recorded, that upon a British Officer's visit to Kashmir in 1822, he had to return from Uri as the Khakha chief would not allow him to pass.

The Khakhas began to intensify their raids in consequence to the weakening Sikh power. Eventually, when Maharaja Gulab Singh assumed rulership of Kashmir, he managed to drive back the Khakhas with great difficulty. But knowing the unrelenting fierce reputation of the rebellious Khakhas, he immediately installed strong garrisons in the forts guarding the passes.

Despite facing the best of the Sikh power to subdue them, they still enjoyed a highly privileged position, paying little if any taxes, openly wearing arms and defying orders where possible.

== Ancestral title and reputation ==
The Khakhas continue their tradition of recording their genealogy.
