= Bomba (tribe) =

Tribe in South Asia

The Bomba, also spelled Bambas, are a tribe found in Pakistani-administered Azad Jammu and Kashmir and the Indian-administered Jammu and Kashmir. In Azad Kashmir, they are primarily found in Muzaffarabad and Neelum districts, with a large number concentrated in and around the town of Ghori. In Jammu and Kashmir, they are found in the Poonch and Rajouri districts of Jammu division. Outside of Kashmir, they are also found in the Boi and Kaghan valleys of Mansehra District, and the city of Abbottabad, all located in Khyber Pakhtunkhwa.

== History ==
In the past Bombas ruled the Jhelum Valley and had a close alliance and kinship with the Khakha Rajput tribe who inhabited the same area. The success of this alliance earned them a warlike and refractory reputation, as they jointly fought the early Mughal rule of Akbar and later resisted the Sikhs. The rajas of the Bomba clan ruled Karnah till the Sikh conquest of Kashmir. The Karnah Bombas and their supporters, the Khakha chiefs of Jhelum Valley, were invaded in 1846.

The Bombas style themselves as Sultans or Raja.

Sultan Muzaffar Khan of the Bomba clan established the city of Muzaffarabad in present-day Azad Kashmir. Sultan Sher Ahmed Khan, the last Bomba ruler, was defeated by the Dogra ruler, Maharaja Ranbir Singh, at Panzgam, Kupwara in present-day Indian-administered Kashmir in the early 19th century.

== Bombas of Hazara ==
The Bomba are found in smaller numbers in the Boi tract of the Mansehra District also in Mansehra city of the Hazara Division of the North West Frontier Province Khyber Pakhtunkhwa. They are represented by three main families of Boi, Tarheri and Sultan Jabri. The laso Kagha and Tarheri families are also important in this region.

== Notable people ==
- Sultan Muzaffar Khan, founder of Muzaffarabad
- Raza Ali Khan, Judge of Supreme Court of Azad Jammu and Kashmir
- Raja Manzoor Ahmad, is an Indian politician from Jammu and Kashmir who served as a Member of the Jammu and Kashmir Legislative Assembly (MLA) from the Karnah constituency in Kupwara district.

== See also ==
- Ethnic groups of Azad Kashmir

=== Books ===
- Stein, Mark Aurel (1989) [1900]. Kalhana's Rajatarangini: a chronicle of the kings of Kasmir, Volume 2 (Reprinted ed.). Motilal Banarsidass. ISBN 978-81-208-0370-1.

Raja Manzoor Ahmad
