= Muzaffarabad =

Capital of Azad Kashmir, a region administered by Pakistan

Muzaffarabad مظفر آباد
- City administered by Pakistan
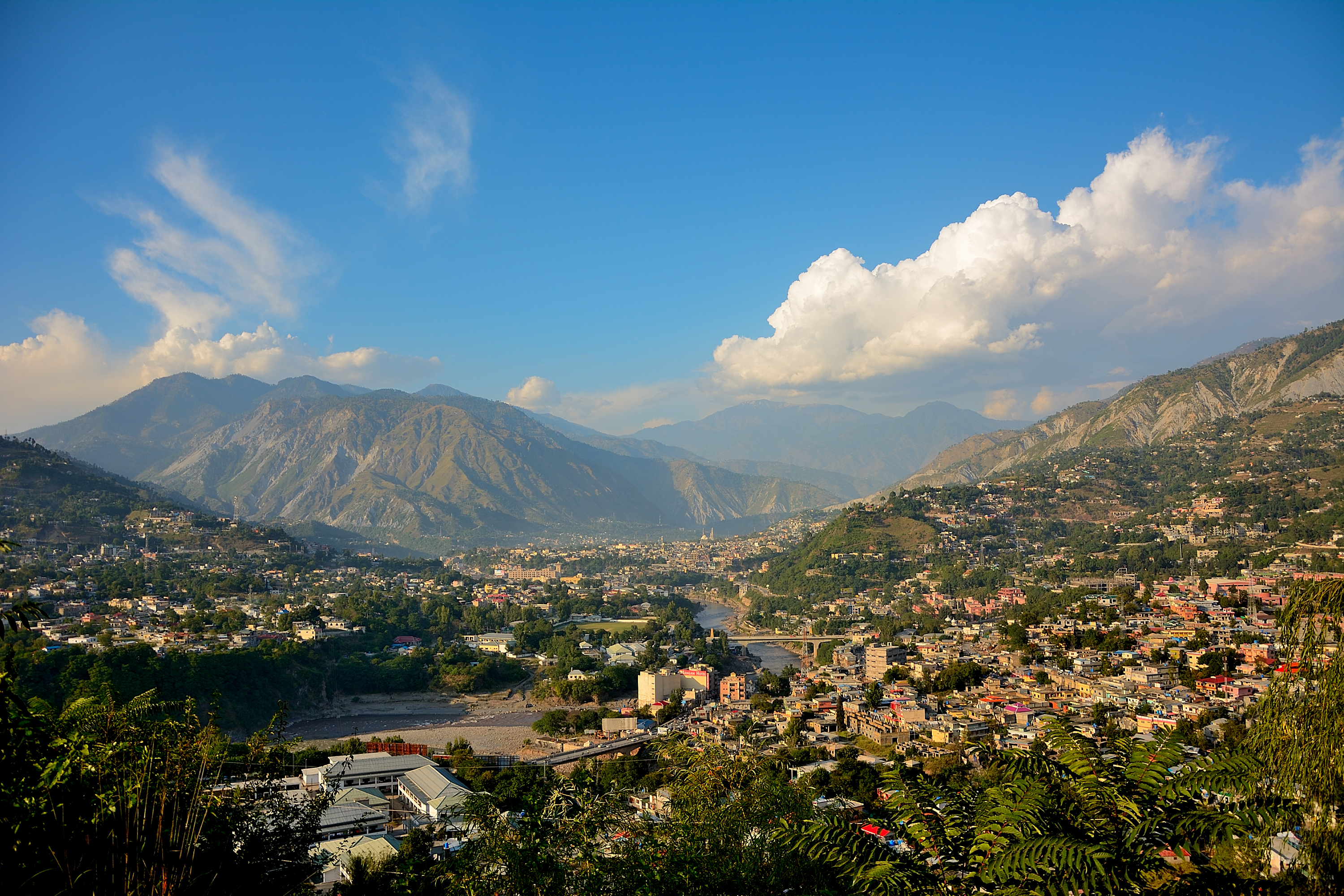
- Aerial view of Muzaffarabad, which is situated in a valley formed by the confluence of the Neelam and Jhelum rivers
- Interactive map of Muzaffarabad
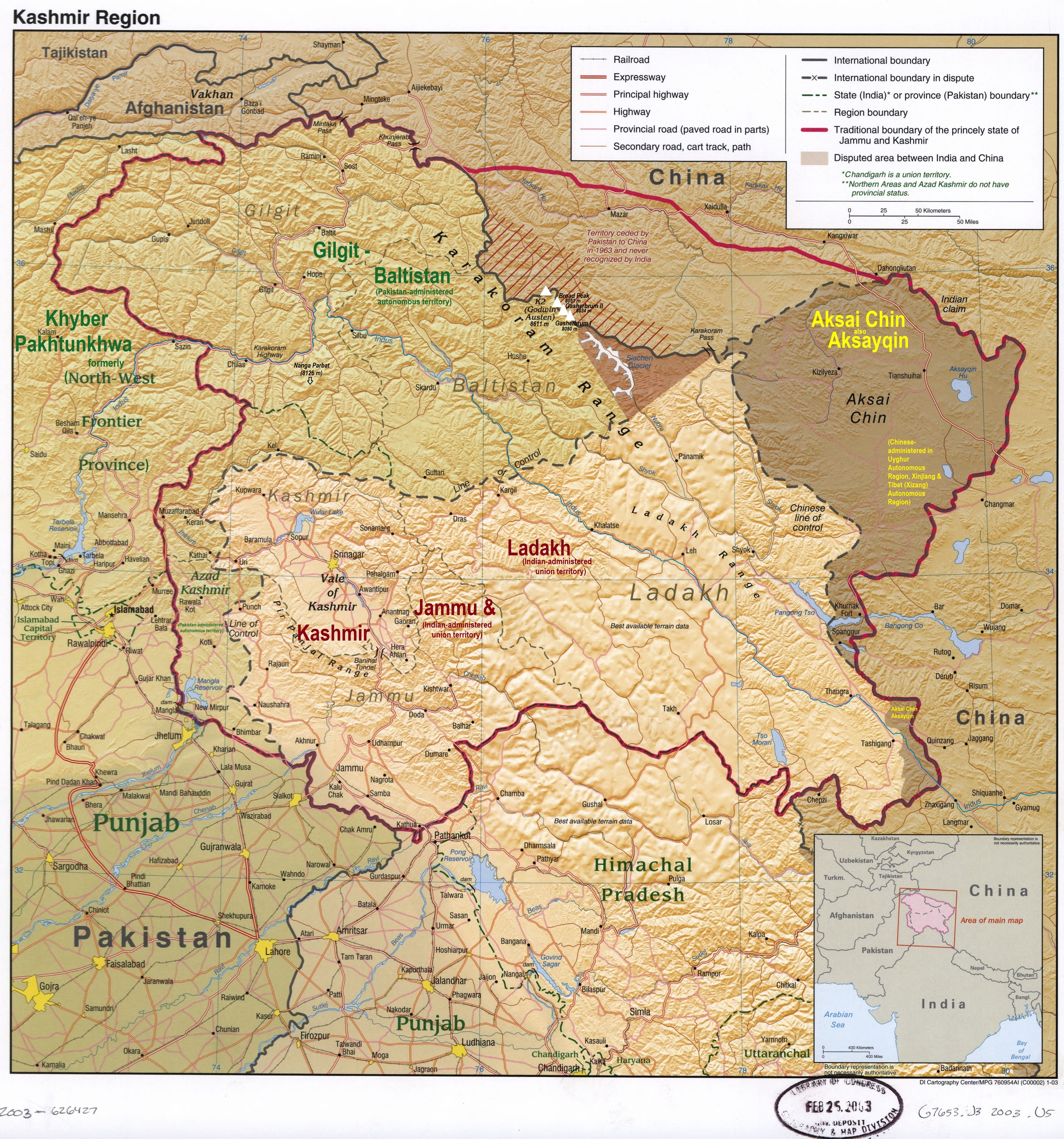
- A map showing Pakistan-administered Azad Kashmir shaded in sage in the disputed Kashmir region

- Location of Muzaffarabad Muzaffarabad (Pakistan)
- Coordinates: 34°21′30″N 73°28′20″E
- Administering country: Pakistan
- Territory: Azad Kashmir
- District: Muzaffarabad
- Established: 1646
- Founder: Sultan Muzaffar Khan

Government
  - Type: Municipal Corporation
  - Mayor: Sikandar Gilani (PML(N))
  - Deputy Mayor: Khalid Awan (PPP)
  - Deputy Commissioner: Tahir Mumtaz BPS-18(PAS)
  - District Police Officer: Mirza Zahid Hussain BPS-18(PSP)
- Elevation: 737 m (2,418 ft)

Population (2017)
  - City: 149,913
  - Rank: 65th, Pakistan

Languages
  - Official: Urdu (Note: Snedden (2013, p. 176): On p. 29, the census report states that Urdu is the official language of the government of Azad Kashmir, with Kashmiri, Pahari, Gojri, Punjabi, Kohistani, Pushto, and Sheena 'frequently spoken in Azad Kashmir'. Yet, when surveyed about their 'mother tongue', Azad Kashmiris' choices were limited to selecting from Pakistan's major languages: Urdu, Punjabi, Sindhi, Pushto, Balochi, Saraiki, and 'others'; not surprisingly, 2.18 million of Azad Kashmir's 2.97 million people chose 'others'.)
  - Spoken: Pahari-Pothwari; Gojri; Kashmiri; Hindko
- Time zone: UTC+05:00 (PST)
- Calling code: 05822
- Website: Muzaffarabad Government Portal (defunct)

Muzaffarabad (Note: /ˌmʊzəˌfærəˈbæd/; Urdu: مُظَفَّر آباد, IPA: [mʊzəfːərɑːbɑːd]) is the capital and largest city of Azad Kashmir, a Pakistani-administered administrative territory in the disputed Kashmir region.

The city is located in Muzaffarabad District, near the confluence of the Jhelum and Neelum rivers. The district is bounded by the Pakistani province of Khyber Pakhtunkhwa in the west, the Kupwara and Baramulla districts of Indian-administered Jammu and Kashmir in the east, and the Neelum District in the north.

== History ==
Muzaffarabad was founded in 1646 by Sultan Muzaffar Khan, chief of the Bomba tribe who ruled Kashmir. Khan also constructed the Red Fort that same year for the purpose of warding off incursions from the Mughal Empire.

=== Sikh Empire ===
In 1827, Raja Zabardast Khan, who had succeeded his father Hassan Ali Khan as the Raja of Muzaffarabad, led a guerrilla campaign against the Sikh Empire, targeting their garrisons in Handwara, Baramulla, and the Hazara region. His leadership and strategic strikes disrupted Sikh control in the area.

Gathering a sizable force, Zabardast Khan declared independence and planned an invasion of the Kashmir Valley. In response, Diwan Kirpa Ram led a large Khalsa army to suppress the rebellion. Between Baramulla and Muzaffarabad, across a span of nearly 77 miles, Zabardast Khan's forces—supported by the local Muslim population—launched persistent attacks on the advancing Sikh army, employing guerrilla tactics from caves, rocks, and forests. The Sikh forces suffered heavy casualties, and Diwan Kirpa Ram's army faced serious defeats and significant losses.

=== Dogra era ===
On 28 May 1849, James Abbott, at the time boundary commissioner, wrote that "intelligence received from Cashmere that a Jumboo Force of 4,000 men is about to march to Moozuffurabad, where there are already 3,000. This report may be a feint of the Maharaja to overcome the hill tribes, who, though quite peaceful at present, have been much opprest [sic] and are ready enough to rise when opportunity offers."

Abbott also wrote that it is "highly desirable therefore that this report, which has greatly alarmed them and may drive them to desperation, be contradicted; and I have accordingly addrest the Maharaja disclaiming belief in such a rumour, and assuring him that any movement of troops in this direction at this moment will not have a friendly aspect. The assembly of any force upon the frontier were an encouragement to the insurgents in Mooltan and to others who are disposed to join them."

The following day on 29 May Abbott wrote:

I had not understood yesterday that another Jumboo force was said to be about to march from Cashmere upon Kurnao, a district between the Cashmere river and the Kishengunga. This Force is rated at 6,000. The mountaineers anxiously enquire of me whether they may not defend themselves from this invasion. I have declined putting any restraint upon their measures of self defence, assuring them, however, that any rising, excepting to resist invasion, would subject them to the displeasure of the British Government. If they can act in concert, they ought to be able to destroy this force, large as it is, their country being strong and the whole population bearing arms.

If these military movements are really contemplated, they are highly objectionable at this season, and of a most suspicious character. The information is the best I can command, and agrees perfectly with the manifest apprehension of the Jumboo Moonshee in my camp. The Maharaja would plead his right to move his troops wheresoever he pleases within his own kingdom, but he is perfectly well aware of the sensation they will create in the Punjaub.

=== Indo-Pakistani war of 1947 ===
The Battle of Muzaffarabad occurred on 22 October 1947 between Pakistani-backed Pashtun tribesmen, pro-Pakistani Kashmiri rebels, and the Jammu and Kashmir State Forces in the town of Muzaffarabad. The battle resulted in a rapid defeat of the Jammu and Kashmir State Forces, leading to the capture of Muzaffarabad by the tribesmen.

=== 2005 earthquake ===
The city was near the epicenter of the 2005 Kashmir earthquake, which had a magnitude of 7.6 M_{w}. The earthquake destroyed about 50 percent of the buildings in the city (including most government buildings) and is estimated to have killed up to 80,000 people in the Pakistani-controlled areas. As of 8 October 2005, the Pakistani government's official death toll was 87,350, while other estimates have put the death toll at over 100,000.

== Administrative subdivisions ==
Muzaffarabad District, highlighted red, shown within Azad Jammu and Kashmir

The district of Muzaffarabad is administratively divided into 2 tehsils, which are subdivided into 25 union councils.

- Muzaffarabad
- Pattika (Naseerabad)

== Climate ==
Climate data for Muzaffarabad (1961–2009)
| Month | Jan | Feb | Mar | Apr | May | Jun | Jul | Aug | Sep | Oct | Nov | Dec | Year |
|---|---|---|---|---|---|---|---|---|---|---|---|---|---|
| Record high °C (°F) | 27.0 (80.6) | 29.4 (84.9) | 37.0 (98.6) | 40.5 (104.9) | 46.5 (115.7) | 46.2 (115.2) | 45.0 (113.0) | 40.2 (104.4) | 39.0 (102.2) | 38.3 (100.9) | 33.0 (91.4) | 27.0 (80.6) | 46.5 (115.7) |
| Mean daily maximum °C (°F) | 16.0 (60.8) | 18.0 (64.4) | 22.6 (72.7) | 28.3 (82.9) | 33.5 (92.3) | 37.4 (99.3) | 34.9 (94.8) | 34.0 (93.2) | 33.4 (92.1) | 30.1 (86.2) | 24.2 (75.6) | 18.1 (64.6) | 22.3 (72.1) |
| Mean daily minimum °C (°F) | 3.1 (37.6) | 5.4 (41.7) | 9.7 (49.5) | 14.2 (57.6) | 18.4 (65.1) | 21.9 (71.4) | 22.8 (73.0) | 22.6 (72.7) | 19.4 (66.9) | 13.7 (56.7) | 7.8 (46.0) | 4.1 (39.4) | 11.1 (52.0) |
| Record low °C (°F) | −3.0 (26.6) | −1.1 (30.0) | 1.0 (33.8) | 6.5 (43.7) | 7.0 (44.6) | 12.0 (53.6) | 15.5 (59.9) | 16.0 (60.8) | 12.4 (54.3) | 6.5 (43.7) | 1.0 (33.8) | −1.4 (29.5) | −3 (27) |
| Average rainfall mm (inches) | 101.3 (3.99) | 137.4 (5.41) | 157.3 (6.19) | 109.0 (4.29) | 78.5 (3.09) | 113.6 (4.47) | 328.7 (12.94) | 229.9 (9.05) | 112.6 (4.43) | 45.9 (1.81) | 37.2 (1.46) | 69.0 (2.72) | 1,242.8 (48.93) |
| Average relative humidity (%) (at 12:00 PST) | 50.3 | 46.3 | 40.9 | 38.0 | 33.2 | 34.0 | 52.2 | 57.6 | 48.1 | 42.4 | 48.4 | 54.0 | 37.2 |
Source: Pakistan Meteorological Department

== Demographics ==
Population

Historical population
| Year | Pop. | ±% p.a. |
|---|---|---|
| 1998 | 85,462 | — |
| 2017 | 149,913 | +3.00% |

City population increased from 85,462 in 1998 to 149,913 in 2017.

Languages

1. Pahari (50.0%)
2. Gojri (35.0%)
3. Kashmiri (15.0%)

According to the Government Published Azad Kashmir 2020 Statistical Year Book, the approximate spoken languages breakdown of Muzaffarabad District is 50% Pahari (including all dialects), 35% Gojri, and 15% Kashmiri.

== Transport ==
Muzaffarabad's public transportation system primarily relies on buses, rickshaws, and small pickup trucks for intracity travel. Following the devastating 2005 earthquake that severely damaged infrastructure, including roads, the city government, with international aid, rebuilt roads, bridges, and other essential infrastructure. However, public transportation remains underdeveloped. Notably, Muzaffarabad lacks a railway system and a functional airport. The nearest railway station is located in the Rawalpindi District of Pakistani Punjab.

== Education ==
Muzaffarabad is the educational hub of Azad Kashmir, hosting several private and public institutions. The education sector in the city is administered by the Government of Azad Jammu & Kashmir. The region has a literacy rate of approximately 77.5% which is significantly higher than the national average of Pakistan. Following the 2005 Kashmir earthquake, which destroyed a significant portion of the city's educational infrastructure, major reconstruction projects were launched to rebuild schools and university campuses. According to the Earthquake Rehabilitation and Reconstruction Authority (ERRA), 7,608 post-earthquake reconstruction projects were planned under three implementation channels: sponsor-funded, donor-funded, and Government of Pakistan–funded. While sponsor- and donor-funded projects were completed, 1,730 Government of Pakistan–funded projects, including 1,112 in education, remained incomplete by 2010 due to funding shortfalls.

=== Higher Education ===
The primary institution of higher learning in the city is the University of Azad Jammu & Kashmir (UAJK). Established in 1980, it is a multi-campus public university, offering undergraduate and postgraduate programs across a range of disciplines. The main campus is located in Muzaffarabad, with additional facilities at the King Abdullah Campus in Chatter Class, which was constructed after the 2005 earthquake as part of the reconstruction of the region's higher education infrastructure.

The King Abdullah Campus was inaugurated in 2023 following a grant of approximately US$90 million from the Saudi Fund for Development. The campus includes around 15 academic departments, administrative blocks, a library, auditorium, and student accommodation facilities. Around 10,000 students are expected to benefit from the facility.

== Notable people ==
- Rashid Naseer, Pakistani cricketer
- Raja Farooq Haider Khan, Politician

== Gallery ==
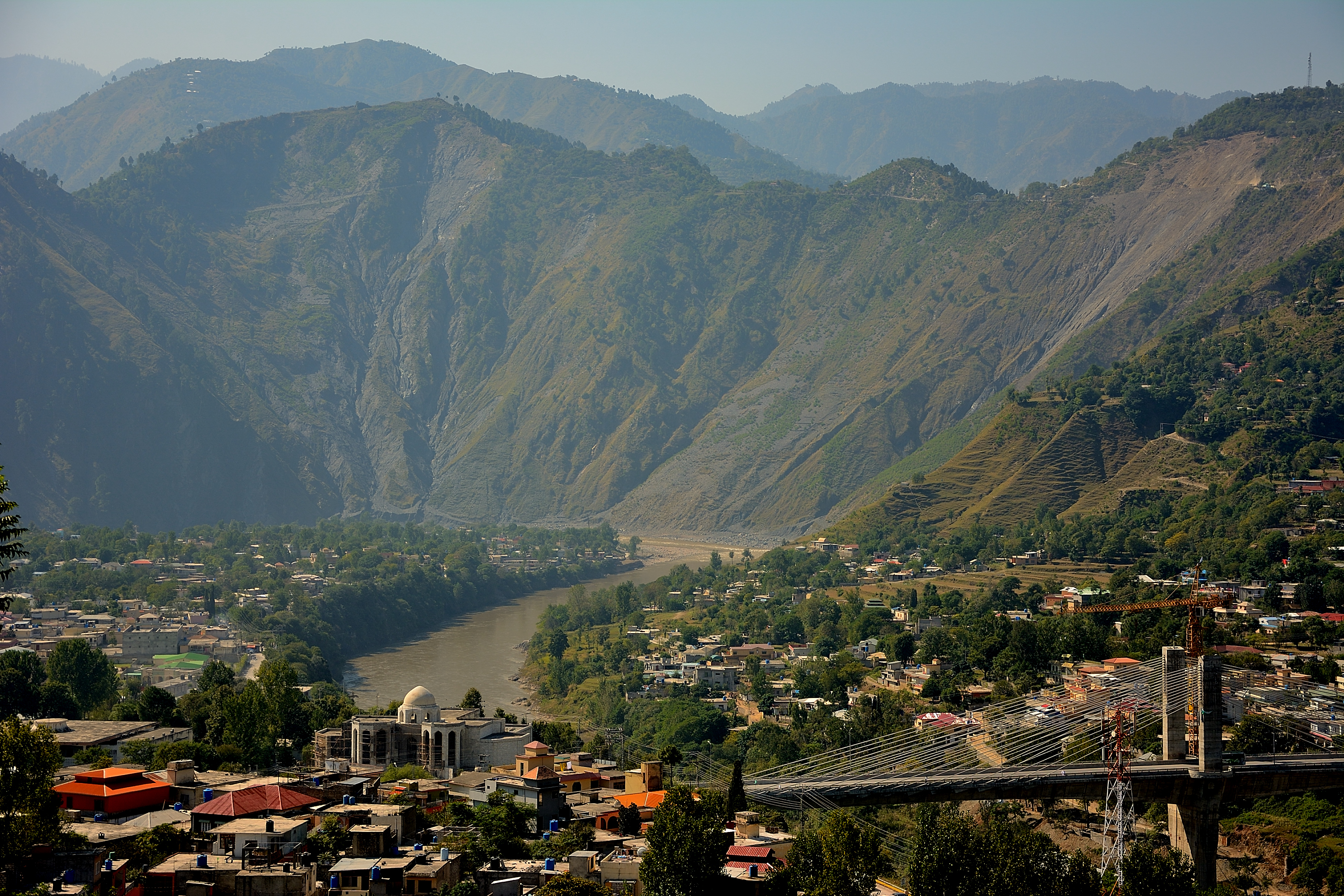
Heightened view of the city on both riverbanks after the 2005 Kashmir earthquake, c. 2014

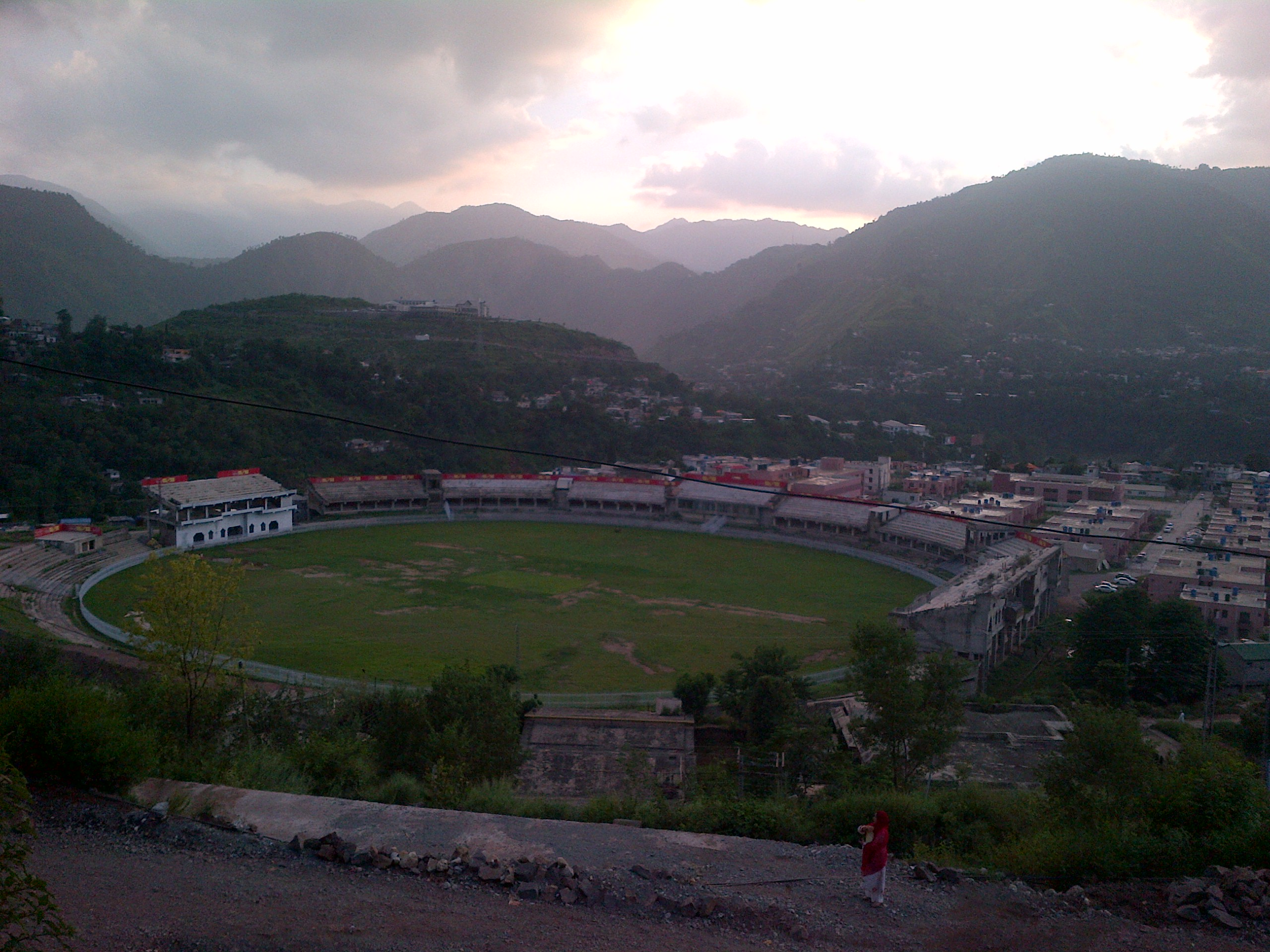
Photo of Muzaffarabad Cricket Stadium

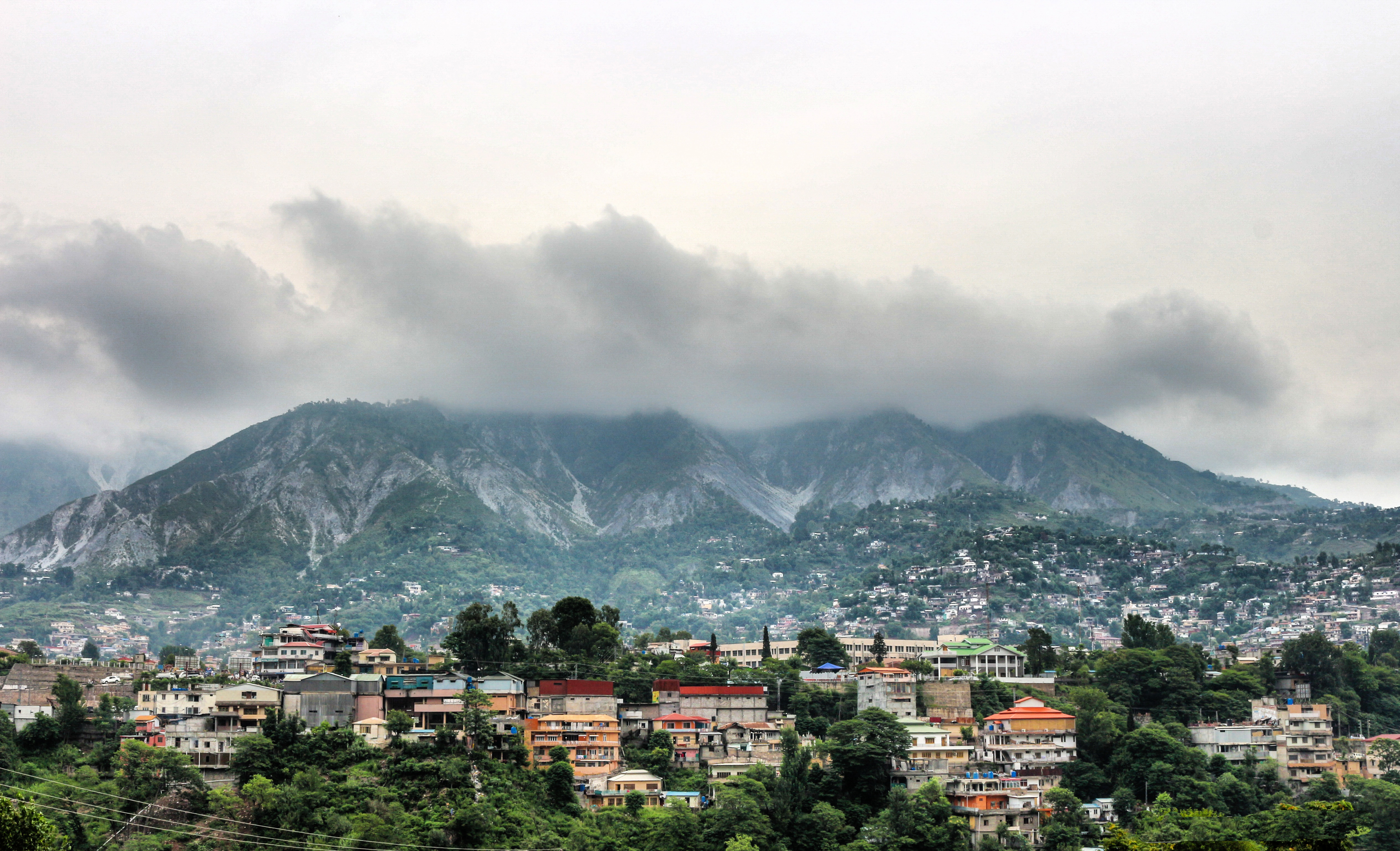
Photo of the city's skyline, c. 2017

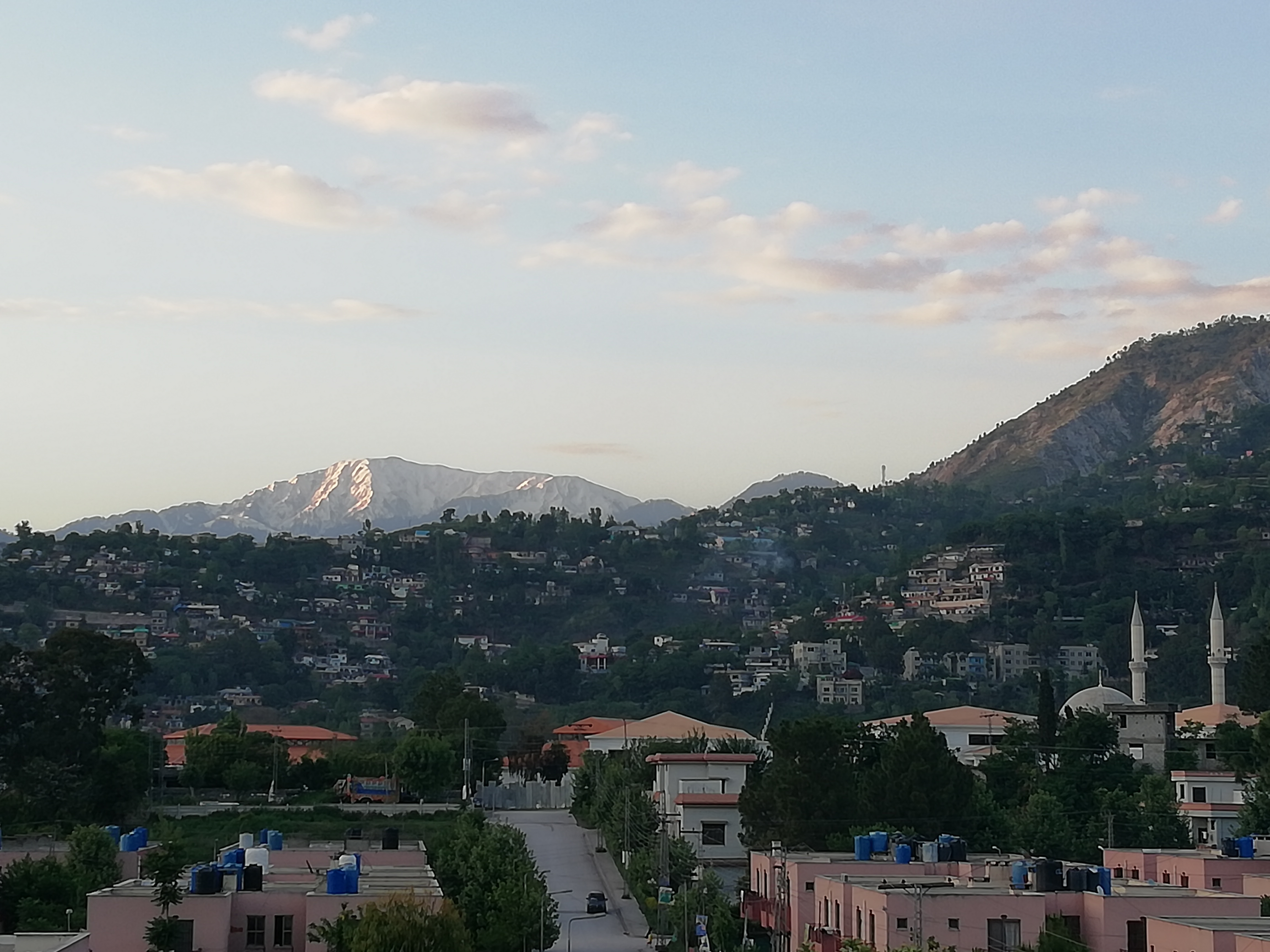
Azad Jammu Kashmir Medical College

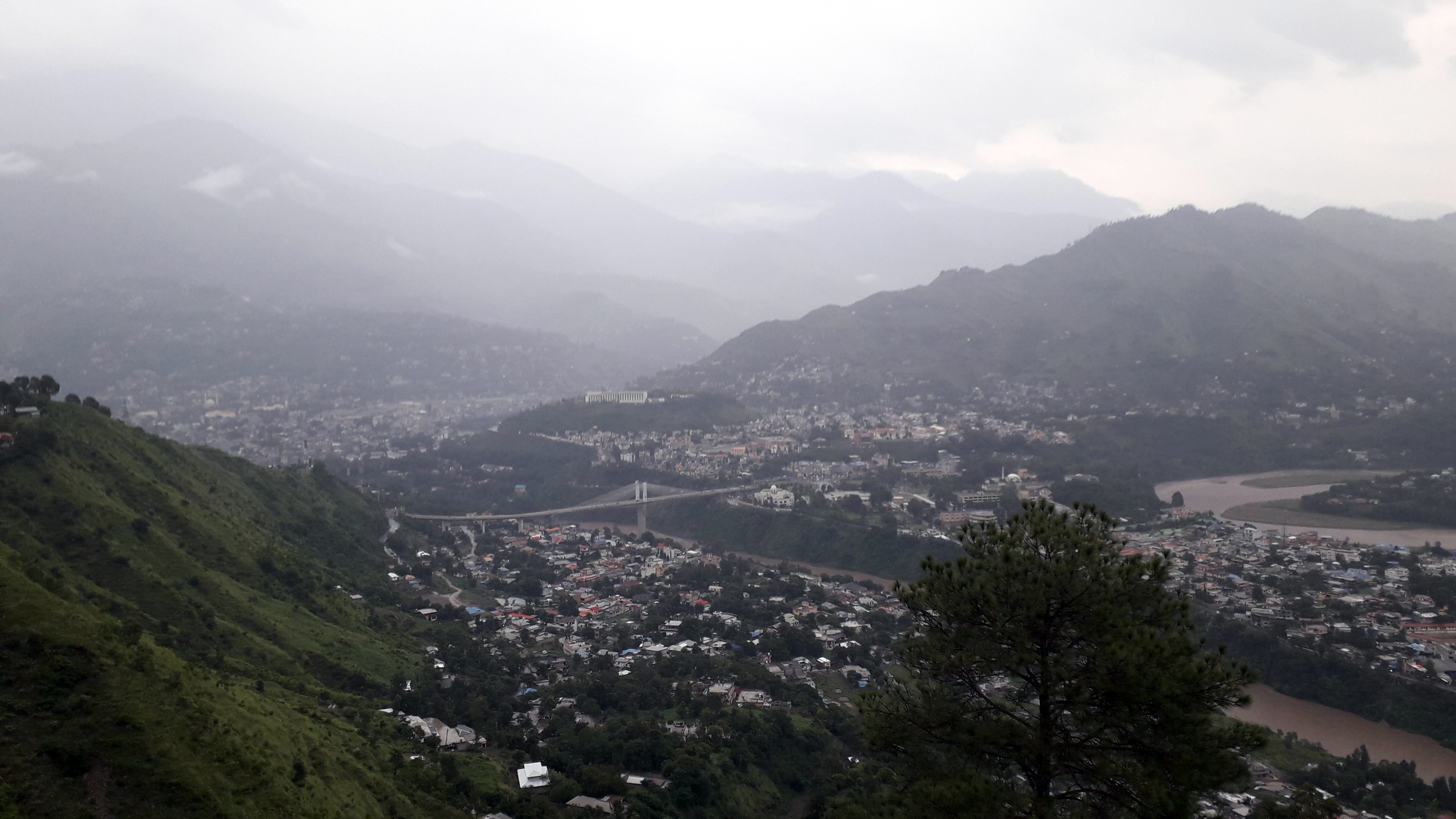
Muzaffarabad City, Azad Kashmir, Pakistan

== See also ==
- Awan Patti

== Sources ==
- Rahman, Tariq (1996). Language and politics in Pakistan. Oxford University Press. ISBN 978-0-19-577692-8.
- Snedden, Christopher (2013) [first published as The Untold Story of the People of Azad Kashmir, 2012]. Kashmir: The Unwritten History. HarperCollins India. ISBN 978-9350298985.
