= Karnah =

- Location in Jammu and Kashmir, India Karnah (India)
- Coordinates: 34.398°N 73.861°E
- Country: India
- State / Union Territory: Jammu and Kashmir
- District: Kupwara
- Time zone: UTC+5:30 (IST)
- PIN: 193225

Karnah is an administrative tehsil in the Kupwara district of the Indian union territory of Jammu and Kashmir, a region disputed between India and Pakistan. It is 69 kilometres (43 mi) from the town of Kupwara, the district headquarter, and is the largest tehsil of the district by area.

== Maa Sharda Devi temple ==
On 22 March 2023, Indian Army inaugurated the Sharda Devi temple in Teetwal, Karnah in Kupwara district with the support of locals of valley, which is close to Line of Control. The architecture and reconstruction of the Maa Sharda Devi temple was done in accordance with the Vedic scriptures under the aegis of Sharada Peeth, and the temple was inaugurated on the first day of Chaitra Navratri.

== Demographics ==
Karnah tehsil has a total population of 60,129 as per the Census 2011, of which 34,471 are males while 25,658 are females, giving a sex rationratio of 744 females per 1,000 males. In 2011 there were total 11,422 families residing in Karnah Tehsil. Paharis form a majority population in the tehsil. As per Census 2011 out of the total population, 25.8% live in urban areas while 74.2% live in rural areas. The average literacy rate in urban areas is 68.4% while that in the rural is 59.9%. Also, the sex ratio of urban areas in the tehsil is 587 while that of rural areas is 807.

== Education ==
In 2008, the UGC-recognized Govt Degree College Tangdhar was established. It is affiliated with the University of Kashmir.

== See also ==
- Sharada Peeth
